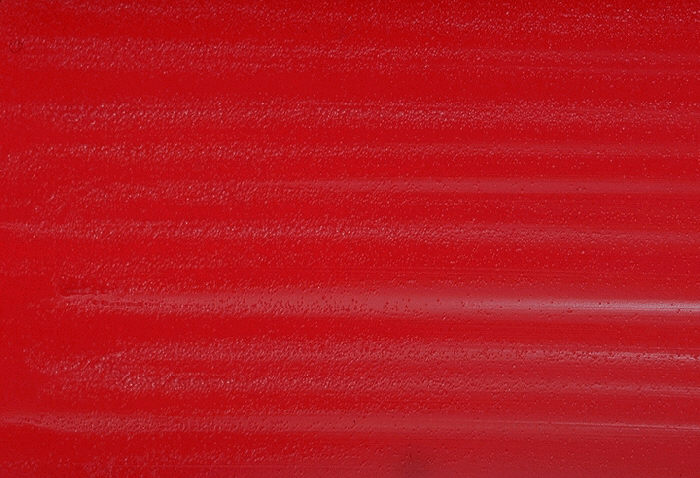
- Cardiobacterium hominis on a blood agar plate

Scientific classification
- Domain: Bacteria
- Kingdom: Pseudomonadati
- Phylum: Pseudomonadota
- Class: Gammaproteobacteria
- Order: Cardiobacteriales
- Family: Cardiobacteriaceae
- Genus: Cardiobacterium
- Species: C. hominis

Binomial name
- Cardiobacterium hominis Slotnick et al. 1964

= Cardiobacterium hominis =

Species of bacterium

Cardiobacterium hominis /ˌkɑːrdiəʊbækˈtɪəriəm ˈhɒmɪnɪs/ (KAR-dee-oh-bak-TEER-ee-um HOM-i-nis) is a microaerophilic, pleomorphic, fastidious, Gram-negative bacterium part of the Cardiobacteriaceae family and the HACEK group. It is most commonly found in the human microbiota, specifically the oropharyngeal region including the mouth and upper part of the respiratory tract. It is one of the causes of endocarditis, a life-threatening inflammation close to the heart's inner lining and valves. While infections caused by Cardiobacterium hominis are uncommon, various clinical manifestations are linked to the bacterium, including meningitis, sepsis, and bone infections.

== Etymology ==
In 1964, researchers I. J. Slotnick and Mary Dougherty named the species after their research on a 54-year-old male patient. The genus Cardiobacterium is a phrase combined with two foreign words, kardia and bacterium. The feminine noun "kardia" translates to heart, and the Latin neuter noun "bacterium" has a meaning of small rod. Hominis is a Latin genitive masculine noun which is translated as human being, of a man. The full genus and species can be translated into English as a bacterium of the heart of a human being, reflecting the original isolation that occurred from the Infective endocarditis in the heart valves.

== Discovery ==
Cardiobacterium hominis was originally discovered in 1962 based on analysis of four cases of Infective endocarditis over ten months. Upon its first isolation, researchers described Cardiobacterium hominis, which was unrecognized then, as a Pasteurella-like organism and categorized as group "II-D" by the Centers for Disease Control and Prevention.

In 1964, researchers I. J. Slotnick and M. Dougherty from the Laboratory of Bacteriology, St. Jude Hospital and Department of Microbiology, University of Tennessee found Cardiobacterium hominis in a 54-year-old male patient with infective endocarditis. Surgeons found a large hole in the aortic valve, and the researchers later cultured the aortic tissue. Gram-negative bacteria with a rod morphology were isolated from the tissue after 48 hours. Cardiobacterium hominis was later identified using mass spectroscopy. Incidentally, the bacteria was later characterized to be another species in the genus Cardiobacterium, because it was found in cardiac tissue and found to be a cause of infective endocarditis. Identifying this bacterium proved to be challenging because of its pleomorphic nature. Cardiobacterium hominis was classified into the HACEK group because of its similar infectious profile to the rest of the HACEK organisms, such as genera groups, Haemophilus, Aggregatibacter, Eikenella, and Kingella, which have all been known to cause endocarditis in humans.

== Taxonomy ==
Cardiobacterium hominis belongs to the domain Bacteria and phylum Pseudomonadota. The organism is a member of class Gammaproteobacteria, order Cardiobacteriales, family Cardiobacteriaceae, and genus Cardiobacterium. The only other species of the Cardiobacterium genus is Cardiobacterium valvarum, known for the oropharyngeal flora and similar causative organism to infective endocarditis. Therefore, Cardiobacterium valvarum is the organism's closest phylogenetic neighbor. The next closest neighbors to the bacteria are in the family of Pseudomonadota, which are commonly referred to as proteobacteria. Some Gram-negative bacteria that are in this phylum are Escherichia, Salmonella, and Vibrio.

== Genomics ==
Genomic DNA was extracted using the Wizard genomic DNA purification kit from the company Promega. DNA sequencing produced 150-bp paired-end reads, with reads shorter than 150 bp disregarded. Assembly was performed by SPAdes genome assembler using different k-mer values from 43-127 and Quast using N50 and L50 scores and the lowest quantity of contigs greater than 1000 bp. Annotation of these assemblies was done using RSAT and analyzed using SEED viewer. Searching for antibiotic resistance genes and prophage sequences were completed via PHAST while identification, using a method that compared translated coding sequences and proteins that correspond to them, was done using the CLUSTAL-W database. It was found after sequencing 2,456,795 15-bp paired-end reads and assembling them, it was found that the RAST system predicted 2,489 CoDing Sequences CDSs with some of the functions being cell wall metabolism, virulence and defense, carbohydrate metabolism, protein metabolism, RNA metabolism, lipid metabolism, and DNA metabolism. After further annotation, some CDSs revealed potential function involved in antibiotic resistance but Resfinder demonstrated a higher sensitivity to antibiotics such as ceftriaxone and gentamicin. Lastly, one complete and two incomplete prophage sequences appeared as well.

DNA sequencing produced 150-bp paired-end reads, with reads shorter than 150-bp disregarded. Annotation of assemblies was done using RAST and analyzed using SEED viewer. Searching of antibiotic resistance genes and prophage sequences was completed via PHAST while identification, using a method that compared translated coding sequences and proteins that are correspondent to them, was done using the CLUSTAL-W database.

Overall, the sequenced T05791 strain of Cardiobacterium hominis was found to have one circular chromosome with a genome size of 2.7 Megabases (Mb) and a G+C content of 59%. The assembly level is a complete genome consisting over around 2670755 nucleotides and a total gene count of 2474, 2412 being protein genes and 42 being RNA genes. The RAST system predicted genes encoding for functions such as cell wall metabolism, defense, carbohydrate metabolism, protein metabolism, RNA metabolism, lipid metabolism, and DNA metabolism In regards to its pathogenicity, Cardiobacterium hominis has very low virulence and minimal genes aid in its pathogenic abilities. Further annotation revealed potential functions involved in antibiotic resistance, but Resfinder demonstrated a higher sensitivity to antibiotics such as ceftriaxone and gentamicin. One complete and two incomplete prophage sequences appeared as well.

== Morphology and physiology ==
Cardiobacterium hominis has inconsistent rod-shaped morphology due to its pleomorphic nature. The rods typically have rounded ends, with one or both being frequently enlarged and are 0.5-0.6 μm in width and 1.0-2.2 μm in length. Other morphological features that have been observed are pairs, short chains, teardrop-shaped, and clusters. The organism thrives in concentrations of around 2-10% oxygen and possesses gluconeogenesis pathways and enzymes necessary to produce nucleotide precursors. Its metabolite utilization includes the ability to build acid from glucose, fructose, and maltose and it possesses some of the physiological and morphological advantages relative to this genus of bacteria including, the ability to live in low oxygen environments, heat and cold resistance (mesophilic), spore formation, and antibiotic resistance except to penicillin. The cell envelope of Cardiobacterium hominis is characterized by a thin peptidoglycan layer surrounded by an outer layer made out of lipopolysaccharides related to Gram-negative bacteria.

== Clinical applications ==
=== Infective endocarditis ===
As a bacterium in the respiratory tract, there have been 61 reported infection cases. These cases include occurrence of infective endocarditis that led to aortic root complications which severely threatened the patient's life. However, based on early identification and surgical procedures that followed, the patient was cured entirely after two years of treatment. This is evidence that early and appropriate diagnosis of Cardiobacterium hominis can lead to successful treatment. Annual occurrence of the disease is 3 to 10 cases per 100,000 people. Researchers found out of 56 patients with infective endocarditis caused by Gram-negative bacteria from 1958 through 1979 at the Mayo Clinic, 6 cases were linked to Cardiobacterium hominis. As part of the HACEK, Cardiobacterium represents the "C" in the acronym. HACEK endocarditis targets patients with a prior heart disease or artificial valves with often an insidious course showing a diagnosis delay of 3 months. Fastidious Gram-negative bacteria such as Cardiobacterium hominis along with Eikenella corrodens and Kingella kingae mainly inhabiting in the oral and upper respiratory tract in humans are responsible for 1–3% of infective endocarditis. Treatment of the disease involves third-generation cephalosporin with more than 80-90% success rate.

=== Therapy ===
Penicillin and ampicillin were used in the past as treatment options for HACEK organisms like Cardiobacterium hominis. The emergence of β-lactamase producing strains led to the standard treatment being cefotaxime or ceftriaxone.
