= Elizabethkingia endophytica =

Scientific classification
- Domain: Bacteria
- Kingdom: Pseudomonadati
- Phylum: Bacteroidota
- Class: Flavobacteriia
- Order: Flavobacteriales
- Family: Weeksellaceae
- Genus: Elizabethkingia
- Species: E. endophytica

Binomial name
- Elizabethkingia endophytica Kämpfer et al. 2015

Species of bacterium

Elizabethkingia endophytica is a slightly yellow Gram-stain-negative rod-shaped bacterial strain isolated from the stem of healthy 10-day-old sweet corn (Zea mays). A comparison of the 16S rRNA gene sequence of the isolate showed 99.1, 97.8, and 97.4% similarity to the 16S rRNA gene sequences of the type strains of Elizabethkingia anophelis, Elizabethkingia meningoseptica and Elizabethkingia miricola, respectively. DNA-DNA hybridization indicated that the strain is representative of a new species.
