= Suttonella indologenes =

Scientific classification
- Domain: Bacteria
- Kingdom: Pseudomonadati
- Phylum: Pseudomonadota
- Class: Gammaproteobacteria
- Order: Cardiobacteriales
- Family: Cardiobacteriaceae
- Genus: Suttonella
- Species: S. indologenes

Binomial name
- Suttonella indologenes (Snell and Lapage 1976) Dewhirst et al. 1990

Synonyms
- Kingella indologenes Snell and Lapage 1976

Species of bacterium

Suttonella indologenes, formerly Kingella indologenes, is a Gram-negative rod-shaped bacterium of the family Cardiobacteriaceae. Like other members of its family, it is a bacterium that is assumed to be normally present in the respiratory tract. It has been found to rarely cause endocarditis, an infection of the heart valves. It also been found in the eye. It may cause eye infections. Little is known about it as a bacterium other than its structure and biochemical composition. Like other members in its family, it has a characteristic 16S ribosomal RNA which consists of 1474 base pairs.

== History ==
In 1976 the species Moraxella kingae was elevated to become its own genus Kingella. Snell and Lapage, introduced two new novel species to the new genus. Kingella indologenes and K. denitrificans. In 1990 Dewhirst et al. moved Kingella indologenes (Snell and Lapage, 1976) to the new genus Suttonella renaming the species Suttonella indologenes at the same time they transferred Bacteroides nodosus (Beveridge 1941) to the new genus Dichelobacter forming the new species name Dichelobacter nodosus. With these changes they reassigned the genera Cardiobacterium, Dichelobacter, and Suttonella to the new family of Cardiobacteriaceae. See below for the phylogeny of the family. The new family of Cardiobacteriaceae is identified through its rod-shape and being Gram-negative. It also has pili, but no flagella. Cardiobacterium hominis also causes endocarditis. Cardiobacterium hominis is part of the HACEK group of bacteria that cause infective endocarditis. S. indologenes is not part of the HAECK group of organisms but has very similar characteristics. After Dewhirst et al., there have not been any major significant breakthroughs in the research into the species S. indologenes. Although there have been discoveries of the species as an endocarditic agent. Additionally the first known case of echocardiographically documented prosthetic endocarditis caused by S. indologenes was presented in 2005.

=== Description ===
Suttonella indologenes are Gram negative, but they can resists Gram decolorization. They are non-motile, but they have type 4 pili (fimbriae), which exhibits twitching motility. They are aerobic, and their aerobic growth is enhanced by high humidity and CO_{2}, disguising the organisms to be facultatively anaerobic. They are straight rods that are 1.0 pm in diameter and 2 to 3 micrometers long and have rounded ends.

The colony morphology of S. indologenes has a characteristic "halo" or fried egg appearance due to its twitching motility. Pinprick colonies with a 1-2mm halo may be obtained after 24 hours of microaerobic growth at 37 °C on blood agar, at least doubling in size after 48 hours.

== Pathophysiology ==
The pathophysiology of Suttonella indologenes is relatively unknown. However it has been shown to be able to cause endocarditis. It most likely follows a similar path with other infective endocarditis causing agents.

=== Hosts ===
The only known host for Suttonella indologenes is humans, however a new species, Suttonella ornithocola has been discovered to cause endocarditis in birds. This makes Suttonella ornithocola the second known species in the genus Suttonella.

=== Life cycle ===
The life cycle of Suttonella indologenes is relatively unknown. Like other members of its family, it is a bacterium that is assumed to be normally present in the respiratory tract. However, it has also been found in the eye.

=== Effects on fitness ===
Suttonella indologenes has been shown to cause endocarditis and eye infections. See epidemiology.

== Epidemiology ==
The epidemiology (morbidity and mortality rates) of Suttonella indologenes is unknown when it causes endocarditis. There is no current method to isolate Suttonella indologenes. It is unknown if the pathogen itself can be infected.

However, in general, the incidence of infective endocarditis in a general population has been estimated at between 2 and 6 cases per 100,000. Additionally, in the incidence rate of endocarditis is likely to increase in people who have current or genetic predisposition to heart problems. Mortality for infective endocarditis is around 20%. Prior to antibiotics survival was not likely.

=== Diagnosis ===
The Gram-negative rod-shaped bacteria can be identified through blood cultures from the heart of patient's displaying endocarditis. It has many characteristics that help distinguish it. Please see the image on the below. It can be differentiated from C. hominis because C. hominis is positive for trypsin, phosphohydrolase, sorbitol, and mannitol acidification, whereas S. indologenes is positive for alkaline phosphatase and Tween 20 and Tween 40 hydrolysis.

=== Prevention ===
Although there is no understanding of the mechanisms by which this specific pathogen operates, it can be safely assumed that extremely hygienic environments are needed when operating on the heart, so that a resulting infective endocarditis does not occur. The endocarditis is clearly a result in a build-up of the pathogen in the heart, most likely vegetating in a thrombus formation. Obviously, living a heart healthy life style is crucial in preventing any major heart complications.

=== Treatment ===
Suttonella indologenes is susceptible to ampicillin and ceftriaxone, with proper dosage it can be treated through the antibiotics. Surgery may be required for some.

== Human relevance ==
The financial impact of this pathogen is unknown. Since the incidence rate is so low, it may not be prioritized but infective endocarditis deserves more attention. Especially, since the exact rate for infective endocarditis is unknown. See epidemiology.

There is some interest in the twitching motility that is most likely caused by its type 4 fimbriae which is somewhat characteristic of its family.
