= Elizabeth King =

Elizabeth King (or variants) may refer to:

- Elizabeth King (author) (1843-1917), British diarist
- Elizabeth King Ellicott (1858–1914), American suffragist
- Lizzie Lloyd King (1847–?), alleged murderer
- Betty King (born c. 1951), Australian jurist
- Betty E. King, American diplomat
- Betty Jackson King (1928–1994), American pianist, singer, choral conductor, and composer
- Betsy King (born 1955), golfer
- Elizabeth King (artist) (born 1950), American sculptor and writer
- Elizabeth O. King (1912–1966), American microbiologist
- Elizabeth King (journalist) (1885–1970), American political journalist
- Elizabeth King, owner of King's Carriage House
- Elizabethkingia, a disease causing meningitis

== See also ==
- Betsy King Ross (1921–1989), American actress, anthropologist and author
- King (surname)
