= Elizabethkingia miricola =

Scientific classification
- Domain: Bacteria
- Kingdom: Pseudomonadati
- Phylum: Bacteroidota
- Class: Flavobacteriia
- Order: Flavobacteriales
- Family: Weeksellaceae
- Genus: Elizabethkingia
- Species: E. miricola

Binomial name
- Elizabethkingia miricola Li et al. 2003

Species of bacterium

Elizabethkingia miricola is a species of bacterium isolated from condensation water in Space Station Mir, related to Elizabethkingia anophelis, the cause of the 2016 outbreak of Elizabethkingia anophelis human infections in Wisconsin that began in early November 2015.

== Taxonomy ==
The genus name Elizabethkingia honors former United States Centers for Disease Control (CDC) microbiologist Elizabeth O. King, and the specific epithet is derived from combining the Russian name of the space station from which the bacterium was isolated, "Mir" meaning "peace," and the Latin "incola" meaning "inhabitant," yielding miricola, "inhabitant of the Mir space station."

== Human disease ==
A 2017 report identified multiregional outbreaks of a meningitis-like disease caused by Elizabethkingia miricola in black-spotted frog farms in China in 2016. The strain was identified by whole-genome sequencing to be closely related to isolates from humans, indicating that E. miricola is capable of being epizootic and may pose a health threat to humans.
