= Cardiobacterium valvarum =

Scientific classification
- Domain: Bacteria
- Kingdom: Pseudomonadati
- Phylum: Pseudomonadota
- Class: Gammaproteobacteria
- Order: Cardiobacteriales
- Family: Cardiobacteriaceae
- Genus: Cardiobacterium
- Species: C. valvarum

Binomial name
- Cardiobacterium valvarum Han et al. 2004

Species of bacterium

Cardiobacterium valvarum is a Gram-negative species of bacteria belonging to the Cardiobacterium genus. It belongs to the HACEK group of fastidious bacteria that are present in normal oropharyngeal flora and can develop into infective endocarditis.

== Microbiology ==
The only other identified Cardiobacterium species is Cardiobacterium hominis. Cardiobacterium species are Gram-negative, pleomorphic rod-shaped bacteria that are catalase-negative and oxidase-positive. When compared morphologically, the two Cardiobacterium species are indistinguishable in culture and Gram stain; however, the two differ in growth patterns: C. valvarum is more fastidious than C. hominis, and is non-hemolytic. C. valvarum is also differentiated by the fact that the species does not produce indole.

Isolates of C. valvarum show optimal growth by day 3 under standard 5% CO_{2} incubation conditions on 5% sheep blood, but scant growth on chocolate agar.

== Identification ==
Members of the HACEK group are difficult to identify through conventional methods. 16S ribosomal RNA genotyping is the necessary method of identifying C. valvarum. C.valvarum bears numerous phenotypic similarities with Pasteurella multocida and is therefore commonly misidentified. The phenylphosphonate reaction and Maldi-TOF mass spectrometry can be used to distinguish the two species.

Cardiobacterium species are broadly susceptible to beta-lactam, trimethoprim-sulfamethoxazole, fluoroquinolones, and aztreonam. Current clinical guidelines recommend that C. valvarum infection be treated with a 4-week course of ceftriaxone or ciprofloxacin.
