= C. hominis =

C. hominis may refer to:

- Campylobacter hominis, a Gram-negative, spiral, microaerophilic bacterium species in the genus Campylobacter
- Cardiobacterium hominis, a bacterium species that normally resides in the respiratory tract but is said to play a role in causing endocarditis
- Cryptosporidium hominis, a medically important protozoan species

== See also ==
- Hominis (disambiguation)
