= Dichelobacter =

Scientific classification
- Domain: Bacteria
- Kingdom: Pseudomonadati
- Phylum: Pseudomonadota
- Class: Gammaproteobacteria
- Order: Cardiobacteriales
- Family: Cardiobacteriaceae
- Genus: Dichelobacter; Dewhirst et al. 1990
- Species: D. nodosus

Binomial name
- Dichelobacter nodosus (Beveridge 1941) Dewhirst et al. 1990

Species of bacterium

Dichelobacter nodosus, formerly Bacteroides nodosus, is a Gram-negative, obligate anaerobe of the family Cardiobacteriaceae. It has polar fimbriae and is the causative agent of ovine foot rot as well as interdigital dermatitis. It is the lone species in the genus Dichelobacter.

Dichelobacter nodosus, formerly Bacteroides nodosus, is a gram negative, rod shaped, obligate anaerobe of the family Cardiobacteriaceae. It has polar fimbriae epitomes that separate the bacteria into multiple serogroups.

Dichelobacter nodosus, along with Fusobacterium necrophorum, co-exist as the causative agents of ovine foot rot and interdigital dermatitis in ungulates globally, especially in temperate zones. Clinical signs can vary into two categories; virulent and benign, with the distinction between the two varying dependent on location.

Treatment options include footbaths, parenteral administration of long-acting antimicrobials, concurrent use of vaccines, and removal of affected sheep into a clean, quarantined area. Environmental management and treatment of infected is required to prevent further bacterial spread.

== Cellular morphology and biochemistry ==
Dichelobacter nodosus is a rod shaped, gram negative, anaerobic obligate bacteria found on hooves which causes ovine foot rot. This bacterium causes the hoof to separate from underlying tissues through the production of proteases and keratinases. Its preferred environments are warm (greater than 10 degrees Celsius) and moist climates.

Dichelobacter nodosus has a primary surface (K) antigen, causing the bacteria to be immunogenic. This bacteria has synergistic effects with F. necrophorum.

There are 10 serogroups that isolates are separated into based on the epitopes of the bacteria's fimbriae. Class I contains serogroups A-C, E-G, I, and M, while Class II contains serogroups D and H. The serotypes are classified on the results of a slide agglutination test.

Virulence of the bacteria vary depending on which strains of D. nodosus is present in the host population. Strains that possess protease AprV2 show a more severe form of foot rot that those of strains with AprB2 proteases.

== Taxonomy and identification ==
Dichelobacter nodosus is in the order Cardiobacteriales.

Identification of this bacteria is achieved by swabbing an infected animals foot, and isolating D. nodosus DNA from the swab. The isolated DNA then undergoes PCR amplification where 16S rRNA, pnpA, rpoD, and aprV2 and aprB2 genes are isolated. The validity of these results vary as there is no evidence of direct PCR-based serogrouping methods that have been proven against a reference.

== Epidemiology ==
Foot rot is one of the top five globally important diseases acquired by sheep. The primary obligate agent for causing disease is D. nodosus, although F. necrophorum has been reported as having synergistic effects in severe cases of foot rot. Outbreaks have been reported in Australia, Britain, Norway, Switzerland.

Dichelobacter nodosus has a global distribution year-round with characteristic highly transmissible peaks occurring in temperate zones where there is adequate moisture and an ambient temperature above 10 degrees. In cooler conditions, such as spring and autumn, higher disease prevalence can be observed in the UK and Ireland. This bacterium has the ability to thrive in moist soil for up to two weeks. In the presence of optimal conditions, the bacterium can live up to 24 days in at least 5 degrees Celsius. In suboptimal conditions, animals will not demonstrate full clinical presentation and mild lesions may be confined to the interdigital skin. Detection of a lower prevalence and persistence occurs in dry warm climates compared to wet cool conditions.

Sheep and goats are the main species affected by the bacterium and are susceptible at all ages. Merino breeds appear to be more susceptible over British breeds of sheep. British breeds appear to carry more natural resistance, displaying mild clinical signs of a short duration. Although, first cross offspring under the correct conditions can develop severe clinical disease. Cattle can become affected, although normally only suffer a mild form of infection. Wild ungulates have been reported to carry the bacterium in Germany and Switzerland.

There are challenges associated with isolating D. nodosus as more molecular-based studies need to be conducted to differentiate persistence in a domesticated farm environment

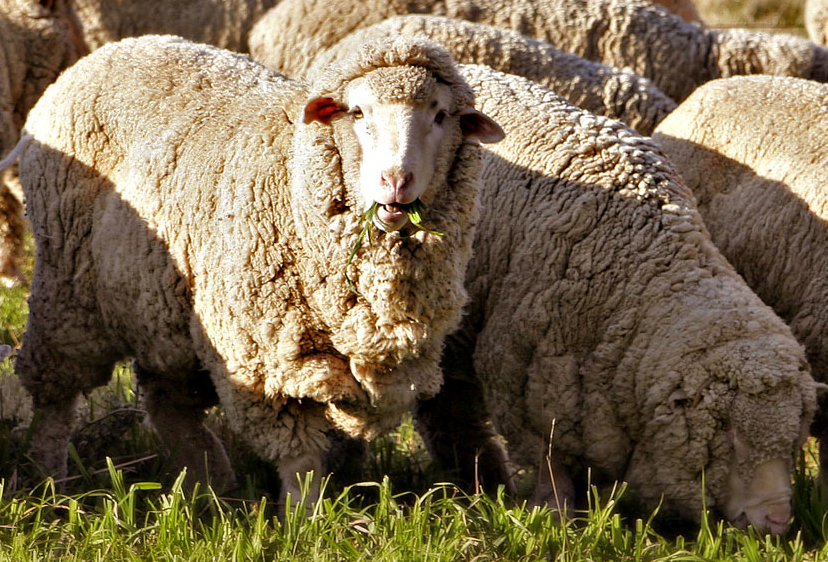
Merino Sheep which are more susceptible to foot rot.

== Pathogenesis ==
Dichelobacter nodosus along with F. necrophorum co-exist and cause a disease known as ovine foot rot, primarily found in sheep and goats. F. necrophorum alone causes foot scald predisposing the animal to co-infection with D. nodosus resulting in foot rot. D. nodosus can also be carried by cattle, deer and horses. D. nodosus infection has been reported in cattle but cases are commonly restricted to benign strains. In order for D. nodosus to cause disease the bacterium requires irritation to the interdigital space, this can be due to moisture or trauma to the area.

The severity of foot rot has a wide range of disease presentation. depending on the strain or combination of strains present in the infected site and the virulence of said strains. D. nodosus releases protease enzymes, it is the number of protease enzymes, type of protease enzymes and the type IV fimbriae that determine its virulence. The protease enzymes digest tissue between the hoof horn and flesh which causes pain for the affected animal.

Foot rot can be classified into benign foot rot and virulent foot rot which contain aprB2 genes that encode for thermolabile proteases and aprV2 genes encoding for thermostable proteases respectively. Benign foot rot is described as reddened and inflamed tissue between the toes. Virulent foot rot is when the bacteria begins to enter the hoof horn and can cause separation of the hoof horn from the hoof wall. In virulent strains the horn may completely separate from the underlying tissue, this makes the tissue susceptible to fly strike.

== Disease ==
Clinical signs of foot rot in sheep can be divided into two categories; benign and virulent. In Australia, the difference between benign or virulent is dependent on the causative strain of D. nodosus acquired foot rot and is associated with the degree of severity of the clinical signs. It can be difficult to tell the difference between the two strains based on clinical signs, some countries, such as the US, consider both the benign and virulent strains the same and treat according to clinical presentation. Clinical signs of benign foot rot are interdigital dermatitis and often, but not always, includes lameness of the affected foot or feet. Clinical signs of virulent foot rot begin as interdigital dermatitis but progress to necrosis, separation of the hoof wall from the underlying soft tissue and severe lameness. However, both categories of foot rot can progress from interdigital dermatitis to more severe, chronic, necrotizing lesions that can have a characteristic putrid smell and cause significant lameness in the affected animal.

== Diagnosis ==
Use of a foot rot scoring guide to help confirm diagnosis and to determine the severity of the disease as well as level of treatment and management that will be required. Scoring is based on the severity of lesions on the interdigital dermis, the junction between the skin and the horn and the horn itself. Cases of benign foot rot tend to score on the lower end of the scale and virulent foot rot cases tend to score on the higher end. Other clinical signs may be present depending on the strain or the severity of the foot rot are loss of appetite, loss of body condition, decrease in wool production, and decreased milk production. Warm and wet conditions are favorable for the spread of foot rot so the presence of these conditions can also help support the diagnosis of foot rot due to d. nodosus as well as promote the spread to other animals in the herd

While not routinely performed, laboratory diagnosis of D. nodosus can be done to determine the virulotype of the infection-causing strain by PCR, gelatin-gel, and elastase assay and can be used to confirm field diagnosis. Identification of extracellular proteases has historically been the basis for the differentiation between the two strains of D. nodosus Benign strains of D. nodosus have proteases that are thermolabile and virulent strains have proteases that are thermostable and have higher elastase activity. Performance of laboratory testing to diagnose specific strains of D. nodosus by determining the protease thermostability and elastase activity are not routinely performed due to the difficulty of the laboratory procedures that often yield inconsistent results. In addition, the time it takes to perform laboratory-based tests to determine the virulotype of D. nodosus is slow and may not be helpful to effectively treat or isolate the infected animal(s) and to prevent spread to other animals.

== Treatment ==
The most effective treatment options for D. nodosus use a multimodal approach to ensure adequate treatment as well as limited subsequent spread . This includes immediate treatment upon identification, foot-baths, parenteral administration of long-acting antimicrobials, concurrent use of vaccines, and removal of affected sheep into a clean, quarantined area.

The prognosis for foot rot is best when treated early, prior to progression of the disease; this helps guide the decision between treatment versus culling of affected animals in order to minimize economic losses. Affected sheep should be monitored to ensure effectiveness of treatment and culled if clinical symptoms persist, as they are a source of contamination for the rest of the flock. Infected sheep should not return to general population until the infection is cleared and the environment is decontaminated to prevent reinfection or spread.

The use of foot bathes containing 10% zinc sulphate solutions have shown to be effective in both treatment and prevention, though use is controversial due to environmental impacts. Efficacy is also reduced when used in severe cases, as the solution has limited penetration, in which case, parenteral administration of antimicrobials is the most effective treatment.

Dichelobacter nodosus has limited ability to persist in the environment, therefore quarantine of infected animals is crucial to prevent spread within a flock.

Concurrent use of a vaccine can also help to limit disease and spread within a flock.

== Antibiotic resistance ==
Oxytetracycline has been the most commonly used antimicrobial for the treatment of D. nodosus. This bacterium has also shown sensitivity to tetracyclines, macrolides, penicillin, cephalosporins, and fluoroquinolones; with recent studies advocating for the efficacy of gamithromycin as an alternative to oxytetracycline. Resistance has not yet been reported with regards to D. nodosus. The use of antimicrobials is limited due to macrolides being of importance within human medicine, and withdrawal rates can impede economic returns and therefore their choice as a treatment option. Improper use of antimicrobials can contribute to resistance, ineffective treatments, and a higher incidence of reinfection within a herd. Early identification of D. nodosus, as well as routine prevention will contribute to reduced reliance on antimicrobials, as well as less stress on emerging resistance, and economic losses.

== Prevention ==
Environmental management and treatment of infected animals is essential for preventing the spread of D. nodosus. Infected animals should be removed from the flock to a clean environment in order to be treated, as the bacterium does not survive well over 3 weeks off a host. Treatment is most effective when the infection is caught early. The bacterium persists on an untreated host as well as moist, warm environments, therefore treatment, proper drainage, ventilation, and sanitation is required to halt the life cycle Reinfection is likely if the environment is not decontaminated as animals are susceptible as soon as the antimicrobials are no longer active.

Once the environment is decontaminated, outbreaks can be prevented by ensuring replacement stock come from a verified source and are quarantined upon arrival until they test negative. New animals should be quarantined, and have their feet examined and trimmed before introduction to the general population and environment. Establishing routine foot bathes containing zinc, copper or formol on a weekly basis reduces the incidence of D. nodosus.

In areas with endemic reports of the disease, a vaccine protocol is also effective in reducing incidence within a flock and concurrent use with infection will aid recovery time. Efficacy of vaccines depends on the type used as well as the strain of D. nodosus that is present on the farm, therefore should be used in conjunction with other prevention efforts.

Inherent resistance has been shown in certain breeds of sheep with altered hoof conformation, and therefore, reduced incidence can be selected for by means of selective breeding and cross-breeding.

== Known strains ==
- Dichelobacter nodosus ATCC 25549
- Dichelobacter nodosus VCS1703A
