= Ignatzschineria =

Scientific classification
- Domain: Bacteria
- Kingdom: Pseudomonadati
- Phylum: Pseudomonadota
- Class: Gammaproteobacteria
- Order: Cardiobacteriales
- Family: Ignatzschineriaceae
- Genus: Ignatzschineria; Tóth et al. 2007

Type species
- Ignatzschineria larvae (Tóth et al. 2001) Tóth et al. 2007

Species
- I. cameli I. indica I. larvae I. ureiclastica

Genus of bacteria

Ignatzschineria is a genus of bacteria from the class Gammaproteobacteria. Ignatzschineria is named after Ignaz Rudolph Schiner.
