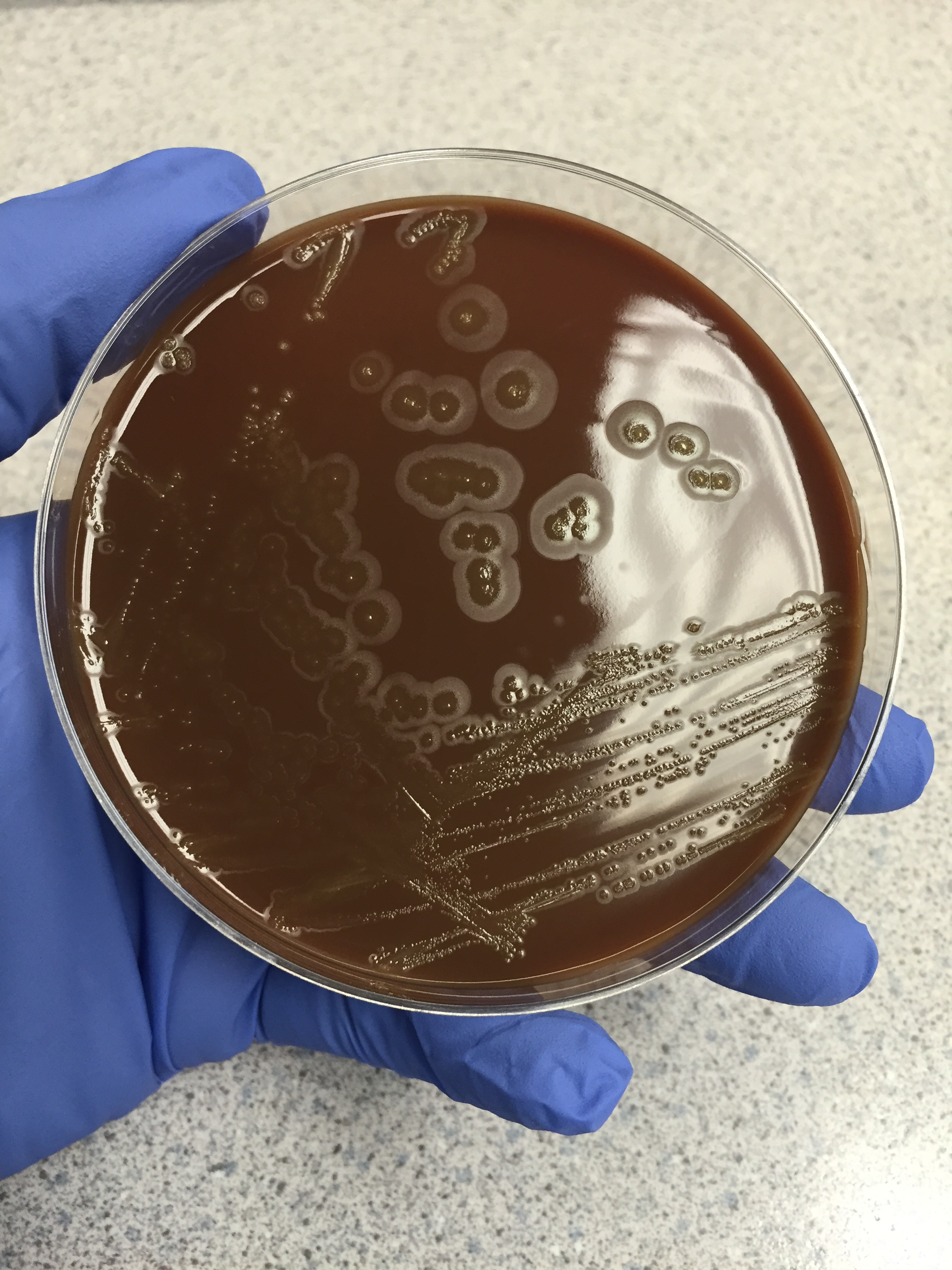
- Eikenella corrodens on chocolate agar after 36 hours. Notice how colonies pit the agar, which is a distinct characteristic of this species.

Scientific classification
- Domain: Bacteria
- Kingdom: Pseudomonadati
- Phylum: Pseudomonadota
- Class: Betaproteobacteria
- Order: Neisseriales
- Family: Neisseriaceae
- Genus: Eikenella
- Species: E. corrodens

Binomial name
- Eikenella corrodens (Eiken 1958) Jackson and Goodman 1972 (Approved Lists 1980)

= Eikenella corrodens =

Species of bacterium

Eikenella corrodens is a Gram-negative facultative anaerobic bacillus that can cause severe invasive disease in humans. It was first identified by M. Eiken in 1958, who called it Bacteroides corrodens. Along with being a HACEK organism, E. corrodens is a rare pericarditis-associated pathogen. It is a fastidious, slow growing, human commensal bacillus, capable of acting as an opportunistic pathogen and causing abscesses in several anatomical sites, including the liver, lung, spleen, and submandibular region. E. corrodens could independently cause serious infection in both immunocompetent and immunocompromised hosts.

== Microbiology ==
Eikenella corrodens is a pleomorphic bacillus that sometimes appears coccobacillary and typically creates a depression (or "pit") in the agar on which it is growing. Only half produce the pitting of the agar considered characteristic. It is a slow-growing, facultative anaerobe and a gram-negative bacillus.

It grows in aerobic and anaerobic conditions, but requires an atmosphere enhanced by 3–10% carbon dioxide.

The colonies are small and greyish, they produce a greenish discoloration of the underlying agar, and smell faintly of bleach (hypochlorite).

They are oxidase-positive, catalase-negative, urease-negative, and indole-negative, and reduce nitrate to nitrite.

In 2006, Azakami et al reported that the periodontal pathogen E. corrodens has an ortholog of luxS, the gene required for quorum sensing (QS) signal molecule AI-2 synthesis and that E. corrodens can produce AI-2 signals for cell-to-cell communication. They additionally reported that AI-2 has a role in biofilm formation by E. corrodens. Karim et al reported that this bacterium can produce AI-2 inactivation enzyme during its stationary phase. Karim et al also reported that LuxS-mediated QS may facilitate the maturation and detachment of biofilm formation in E. corrodens, which can lead to progression of periodontal disease.

== Medical importance ==
A member of the human microbiome, Eikenella corrodens is a commensal bacterial species found in the mouth and upper respiratory tract. It is an unusual cause of infection and when it is cultured, it is most usually found mixed with other organisms. Infections most commonly occur in patients with cancers of the head and neck, but can occur in human bite infections, especially "reverse bite", "fight bite", or "clenched fist injuries". It can also cause infections in insulin-dependent diabetics and intravenous drug users who lick their needles ("needle-licker's osteomyelitis"). It is one of the HACEK group of infections which are a cause of culture-negative endocarditis. In general, the HACEK organisms are responsible for approximately 3% of all cases of infective endocarditis (IE). IE due to E. corrodens is usually a result of poor oral hygiene and or periodontal infection. Manipulation of the gingival or oral mucosa for dental procedures also can predispose patients to infection since E. corrodens is a constituent of the human oral flora. E. corrodens can coexists and is frequently detected with other pathogens including Staphylococcus and Streptococcus.

Eikenella corrodens infections are typically indolent (the infection does not become clinically evident until a week or more after the injury). They also mimic anaerobic infection in being extremely foul-smelling.

Eikenella corrodens was mentioned in an episode of Forensic Files, in which a hotel employee punched a woman in the mouth, knocking out two of her teeth. Her tooth bacteria caused a major infection in the man's hand.

== Treatment ==
For accurate diagnoses, a high degree of suspicion is required in order to properly attribute an infection to Eikenella corrodens. The identification of E. corrodens may be delayed because of its slow growth in the absence of CO_{2}. E. corrodens can be treated with penicillins, cephalosporins, or tetracyclines, however due to the resistant nature of the bacteria ongoing and recurring symptoms can be expected despite rigorous and prolonged antibiotic treatment. Submandibular and peritonsillar abscesses caused by E. corrodens can be treated by incision and drainage. Earlier diagnosis and proper drainage surgery with effective antibiotics treatment may improve the prognosis. First-choice drugs for E. corrodens infections should be third-generation cephems, carbapenems, or new quinolones. It is innately resistant to macrolides (e.g., erythromycin), clindamycin, and metronidazole. It is susceptible to fluoroquinolones (e.g., ciprofloxacin) in vitro, but no clinical evidence is available to advocate their use in these infections.
