= Kingella denitrificans =

Scientific classification
- Domain: Bacteria
- Kingdom: Pseudomonadati
- Phylum: Pseudomonadota
- Class: Betaproteobacteria
- Order: Neisseriales
- Family: Neisseriaceae
- Genus: Kingella
- Species: K. denitrificans

Binomial name
- Kingella denitrificans (Snell & Lapage, 1976)

Species of bacterium

Kingella denitrificans is a species of Gram-negative bacteria in the genus Kingella, belonging to the family Neisseriaceae. K. denitrificans is an inhabitant of the human oropharynx and an infrequent cause of bacterial infections in humans.

== Description ==
K. denitrificans is able to grow at 30 °C and 37 °C. On blood agar, colonies are small, translucent, and non-hemolytic colonies, and some colonies may pit the agar.

K. denitrificans is oxidase positive and catalase negative. This species is able reduce nitrate and nitrite, and produce gas from nitrite. K. denitrificans is negative for β-galactosidase production and citrate utilization.

=== Similarities to pathogenic Neisseria ===
Kingella denitrificans may be confused with Neisseria gonorrhoeae or Neisseria meningitidis because it shares several preliminary laboratory characteristics, including growth on selective Neisseria media and an oxidase-positive reaction. These biochemical similarities include:

- Growth on MTM agar
- Oxidase-positive
- Coccobacillary morphology on Gram stain that may resemble Gram-negative cocci
- Carbohydrate utilization pattern of glucose-positive, maltose-negative, and sucrose-negative, which resembles N. gonorrhoeae in CTA sugar testing.
- Cross reactivity with N. gonorrhoeae in some serological tests.

K. denitrificans can be differentiated from pathogenic Neisseria through its negative catalase and superoxol reactions.

== Clinical significance ==
Kingella denitrificans is rarely reported as a cause of human disease compared with Kingella kingae. Published infections include peritonitis, prosthetic endocarditis, and granulomatous disease in an immunocompromised patient.
