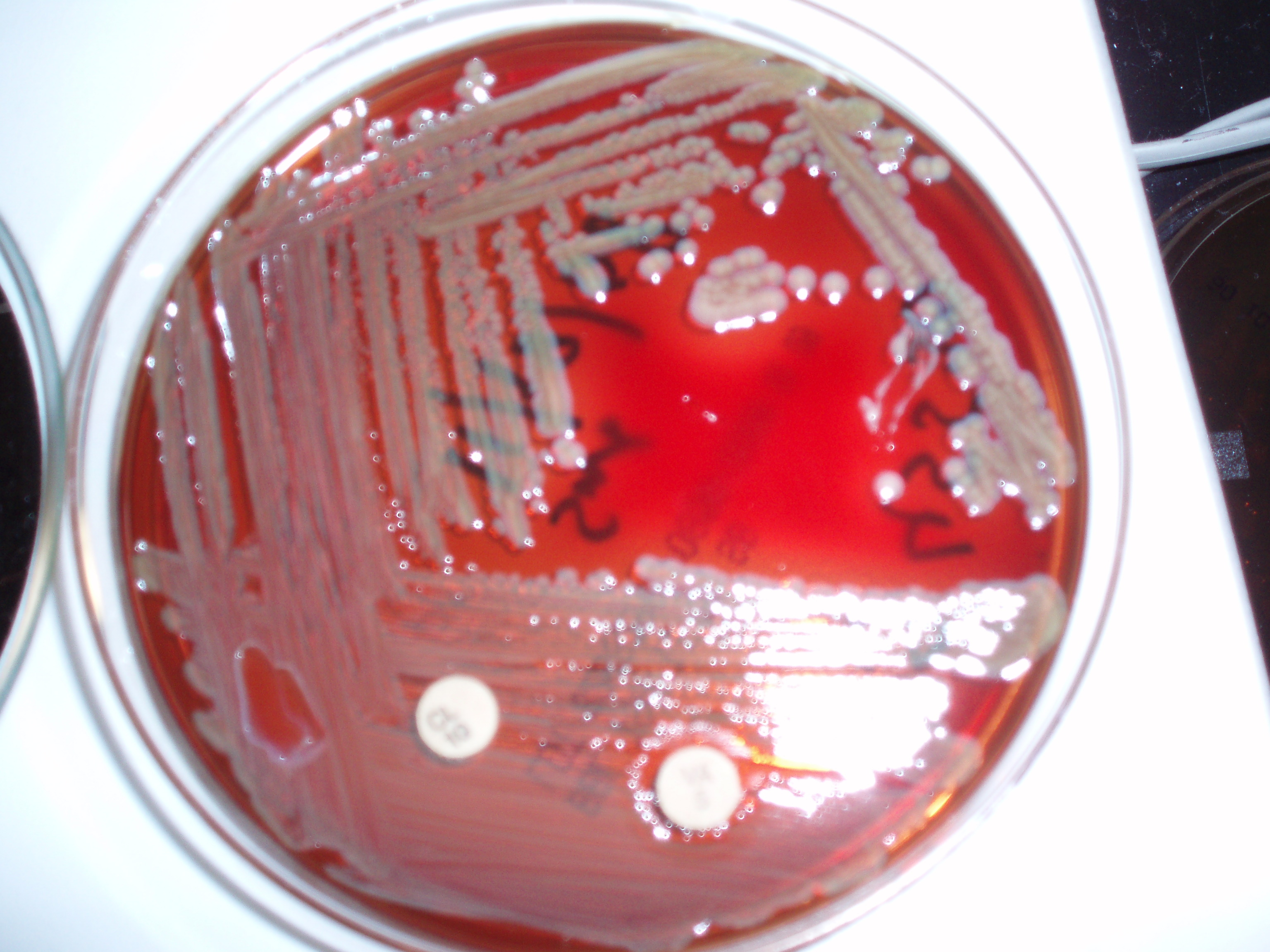
- Wet raised colonies with clear margin and characteristic smell after culturing on blood agar, bacteria plated in this way may not show yellow color. Vancomycin sensitivity (clearing around disk) and colistin resistance may lead to mistaking this organism as Gram-positive.

Scientific classification
- Domain: Bacteria
- Kingdom: Pseudomonadati
- Phylum: Bacteroidota
- Class: Flavobacteriia
- Order: Flavobacteriales
- Family: Weeksellaceae
- Genus: Elizabethkingia
- Species: E. meningoseptica

Binomial name
- Elizabethkingia meningoseptica (King, 1959) Kim et al., 2005

Synonyms
- Flavobacterium meningosepticum King 1959; Chryseobacterium meningosepticum (King 1959) Vandamme et al. 1994; Elizabethkingia meningoseptica (King 1959) Kim et al. 2005

= Elizabethkingia meningoseptica =

Species of bacterium

Elizabethkingia meningoseptica is a Gram-negative, rod-shaped bacterium widely distributed in nature (e.g. fresh water, salt water, or soil). It may be normally present in fish and frogs; it may be isolated from chronic infectious states, as in the sputum of cystic fibrosis patients. In 1959, American bacteriologist Elizabeth O. King (who isolated Kingella kingae in 1960) was studying unclassified bacteria associated with pediatric meningitis at the Centers for Disease Control and Prevention in Atlanta, when she isolated an organism (CDC group IIa) that she named Flavobacterium meningosepticum (Flavobacterium means "the yellow bacillus" in Latin; meningosepticum likewise means "associated with meningitis and sepsis"). In 1994, it was reclassified in the genus Chryseobacterium and renamed Chryseobacterium meningosepticum(chryseos = "golden" in Greek, so Chryseobacterium means a golden/yellow rod similar to Flavobacterium). In 2005, a 16S rRNA phylogenetic tree of Chryseobacteria showed that C. meningosepticum along with C. miricola (which was reported to have been isolated from Russian space station Mir in 2001 and placed in the genus Chryseobacterium in 2003) were close to each other but outside the tree of the rest of the Chryseobacteria and were then placed in a new genus Elizabethkingia named after the original discoverer of F. meningosepticum.

== Presence in plants ==
Two species of Elizabethkingia have recently been found to be abundant on the leaf and root surfaces of the tropical tree Gnetum gnemon in Malaysia. Their role in the biology of the plant is unknown. Several other species of tropical trees studied did not have Elizabethkingia present on their leaves or roots, suggesting a host-specific relationship with Gnetum.

== Microbiology ==
Under a microscope, E. meningoseptica appears as slender, slightly curved rods which are nonmotile and are negative by Gram stain. They do not form spores, and require oxygen to survive. E. meningoseptica is positive by the catalase test, the oxidase test, and the indole test. It is negative by the urease test. In general, it is negative by the nitrate reductase test, although some strains are positive.

E. meningoseptica grows well on blood agar and chocolate agar. Colonies are very pale yellow and may not be easily evident at 24 hours. Strains growing better at 40 °C are mostly associated with invasive meningitis. Often, a greyish discoloration is seen around the colonies on blood agar due to proteases and gelatinase. E. meningoseptica grows poorly on MacConkey agar and is considered a glucose oxidizer. Most strains do not grow on colistin nalidixic acid agar because, although they are resistant to colistin, they are susceptible to quinolones such as nalidixic acid.

E. meningoseptica may show colistin-resistant and vancomycin-sensitive growth, which is paradoxic for a Gram-negative bacterium, but resembles Burkholderia cepacia, which is also a nonfermenter and does not grow well on MacConkey agar. These two can be distinguished by the indole test or the Pyr test, both of which should be clearly negative for B. cepacia and positive for E. meningoseptica. Automated bacterial identification system results should be observed with caution, especially when a patient with Gram-negative bacteremia does not improve with broad-spectrum antibiotic therapy, because several bacteria, including Aeromonas salmonicida (mistaken by ID32 GN) and Sphingobacterium spp. (mistaken by Vitek 2), may be confused with this bacterium, especially the atypical ones. However, unlike many other Aeromonas species such as A. hydrophila and A. punctata, A. salmonicida is indole negative, which can help in distinguishing it in doubtful cases. An automated but so far relatively reliable Rapid NF plus system and API Zym systems use an array of biochemical tests for better identification of nonfermenters and other bacteria and can specifically identify E. meningoseptica.

== Infection ==
E. meningoseptica predominantly causes outbreaks of meningitis in premature newborns and infants in neonatal intensive care units of underdeveloped countries.

Some of the outbreaks have been linked to sources such as contaminated lipid stock bottles, contaminated venous catheter lines and nutritional solution, and tap water. The bacterium is also a rare cause of nosocomial pneumonia, endocarditis, postoperative bacteremia, and meningitis in immunocompromised adults. Only recently has it also been found to cause soft-tissue infection and sepsis in the immunocompetent and in a case of a fatal necrotizing fasciitis in a diabetic patient.

Some 48 cases of Elizabethkingia infection resulting in 17 fatalities were reported in Wisconsin over a 5-month period beginning in November 2015.

=== Antimicrobial susceptibility ===
This bacterium is usually multiresistant to antibiotics typically prescribed for treating Gram-negative bacterial infections, including extended-spectrum beta-lactam agents (due to production by most strains of two betalactamases: one ESBL and one class B carbapenem-hydrolyzing metallolactamase), aminoglycosides, tetracycline, and chloramphenicol. Though vancomycin has been used in the past, its high Minimum inhibitory concentration (16 μg/mL) has led to a search for alternatives, especially for meningitis. Presently, ciprofloxacin, minocycline, trimethoprim-sulfamethoxazole, rifampin, and novobiocin are considered good alternatives. Most of these are classic drugs for Gram-positive bacteria and not routinely tested on Gram-negative bacteria.

=== Predictors of poor outcome ===
Hypoalbuminemia, increased pulse rate at the onset of infection, and central venous line infection were associated with a poor outcome.

== Resource persons ==
At the 2006 meeting of the International Committee on Systematics of Prokaryotes, the organization's subcommittee on the taxonomy of Flavobacterium and Cytophaga-like bacteria named J.-F. Bernardet and B. Bruun as two key authorities on this bacterium.

== Unambiguous synonyms ==
- Flavobacterium meningosepticum King, 1959 (Approved Lists, 1980)
- Chryseobacterium meningosepticum (King, 1959) Vandamme et al., 1994
- Elizabethkingia meningoseptica (King, 1959) Kim et al., 2005

== See also ==
- Wisconsin 2016 Elizabethkingia anophelis outbreak
