= Ignatzschineria larvae =

Scientific classification
- Domain: Bacteria
- Kingdom: Pseudomonadati
- Phylum: Pseudomonadota
- Class: Gammaproteobacteria
- Order: Cardiobacteriales
- Family: Ignatzschineriaceae
- Genus: Ignatzschineria
- Species: I. larvae

Binomial name
- Ignatzschineria larvae (Tóth et al. 2001) Tóth et al. 2007

Type strain
- CCUG 54526, CIP 107108, DSM 13226, L1/68, LMG 22971, NCAIM B.01938

Synonyms
- Schineria larvae

Species of bacterium

Ignatzschineria larvae is a bacterium from the Ignatzschineria genus which has been isolated from larvae of the flesh fly Wohlfahrtia magnifica at Mezöfalva State Farm in Hungary.
