= Schädler agar =

Growth medium

Schädler agar is a nutrient-rich growth medium primarily used in microbiology for the cultivation of anaerobic bacteria. It was developed to support the growth of a wide variety of anaerobic organisms, providing a conducive environment for both fastidious and non-fastidious anaerobes. The medium contains a combination of peptones, yeast extract, and other nutrients that create an optimal growth environment. Additionally, reducing agents such as cysteine and sodium thioglycolate are included to maintain the anaerobic conditions necessary for the survival of these bacteria.

== Components and preparation ==
Schädler agar is composed of several key ingredients that provide the necessary nutrients and environment for anaerobic bacterial growth:

- Peptones: serve as a source of nitrogen and amino acids.
- Yeast extract: provides vitamins, particularly B vitamins, and other growth factors.
- Dextrose: a source of carbon and energy.
- Sodium chloride: maintains osmotic balance.
- L-Cysteine: acts as a reducing agent to create anaerobic conditions.
- Sodium thioglycolate: another reducing agent that helps maintain anaerobic conditions.
- Agar: a solidifying agent that provides a firm surface for bacterial growth.

== Preparation ==
- Mixing: all dry ingredients are measured and mixed together.
- Dissolving: the mixture is dissolved in distilled water with constant stirring.
- Sterilization: the solution is sterilized by autoclaving at 121 °C for 15 minutes.
- Cooling and pouring: after autoclaving, the medium is allowed to cool to approximately 45-50 °C and then poured into sterile petri dishes.
- Solidification: the medium is left to solidify at room temperature before use.

== Medical applications ==
Schädler agar is extensively used in clinical laboratories for the isolation and identification of anaerobic bacteria from clinical specimens. Its applications include:

- Identification of bacteria: it is employed to isolate and cultivate anaerobes from various clinical specimens, including blood, tissue, and body fluids, aiding in the diagnosis of infections such as abscesses, bacteremia, and peritonitis.
- Antimicrobial susceptibility testing: Schädler agar can be used in conjunction with other tests to determine the antimicrobial susceptibility of anaerobic bacteria, guiding appropriate antibiotic therapy.
- Research: it is also valuable in microbiological research for studying the physiology and pathogenicity of anaerobic bacteria, contributing to a better understanding of these organisms and their role in human health and disease.
