= Ignatzschineria cameli =

Scientific classification
- Domain: Bacteria
- Kingdom: Pseudomonadati
- Phylum: Pseudomonadota
- Class: Gammaproteobacteria
- Order: Cardiobacteriales
- Family: Ignatzschineriaceae
- Genus: Ignatzschineria
- Species: I. cameli

Binomial name
- Ignatzschineria cameli Tsang et al. 2018

Type strain
- CCOS1165, UAE-HKU57, UAE-HKU58

Species of bacterium

Ignatzschineria cameli is a Gram-negative and non-motile bacterium from the genus Ignatzschineria which has been isolated from necrotic foot tissue of a dromedary.
