= Ignatzschineria indica =

Scientific classification
- Domain: Bacteria
- Kingdom: Pseudomonadati
- Phylum: Pseudomonadota
- Class: Gammaproteobacteria
- Order: Cardiobacteriales
- Family: Ignatzschineriaceae
- Genus: Ignatzschineria
- Species: I. indica

Binomial name
- Ignatzschineria indica Gupta et al. 2011

Type strain
- DSM 22309, FFA1, KCTC 22643, NCIM 5325

Species of bacterium

Ignatzschineria indica is a Gram-negative, aerobic, non-spore-forming and non-motile bacterium from the genus Ignatzschineria which has been isolated from the gut content of flesh flies from Pune in India. The species has been associated with a few cases of infection in humans.
