= Monkey bite =

Medical condition

A monkey bite is the bite of a monkey and is the second most common animal bite after dog bites in India. Monkey bites account for 2–21% of animal bite injuries. Monkey bites are an important risk among travelers and after dog bites is the most common animal bite for travelers. Treatment depends upon many factors including the suspicion of rabies. Management involves:

- wound cleansing and care
- prophylactic antibiotics
- post-bite rabies treatment
- post-bite tetanus treatment

Serious infections can result after a monkey bite. Simian herpes B virus is endemic in some species of Asian monkeys. It was first identified by an investigator who was bitten by what appeared to be a healthy monkey. The investigator died shortly thereafter from brain inflammation (encephalitis). Subsequent simian-acquired infections with this virus have occurred with mortality rate as high as 80%. Currently, transmission of the virus through a monkey bite almost always is the result of an occupational exposure by biomedical research workers.

The progression of the infection has been described: "[The infection presents with] herpetic skin lesions and sensory changes [are visible] near the exposure site, fever and nonspecific flu-like myalgias and headaches, fatigue, and progressive neurologic impairment, including dyspnea. Once the central nervous system is involved, the outcome is invariably fatal. But with the deployment of antiviral therapy, both for prophylaxis and treatment, cases are now infrequent and deaths are rare, although they have occurred."

Prevention is accomplished through education and traveler's warnings. Prevention also includes the surveillance for the presence of rabies within monkey populations. Research is lacking in the assessment of the impact of monkey bites. From 1960 to 2013, 159 cases of rabies infections in humans have been documented as a result of monkey bites. These numbers were gathered from records of traveler's injuries and the prevalence of monkey bites in area residents is assumed to be much higher.

== Notable deaths by monkey bites ==
- On 2 October 1920, Alexander of Greece was bitten on the leg and torso by a domestic Barbary macaque while trying to separate it from his German Shepherd Fritz. Although his wounds were immediately cleaned, they were not cauterized and became infected. Alexander developed a strong fever and a sepsis, which led to his death on 25 October.
- On 27 August 2024, a 56-year-old man died of brain-swelling rabies after being bitten by a marmoset in July.

== See also ==
- Animal attacks
- Anthrozoology
- Dangerous Dogs Act 1991
