= Haemophilus parainfluenzae =

Scientific classification
- Domain: Bacteria
- Kingdom: Pseudomonadati
- Phylum: Pseudomonadota
- Class: Gammaproteobacteria
- Order: Pasteurellales
- Family: Pasteurellaceae
- Genus: Haemophilus
- Species: H. parainfluenzae

Binomial name
- Haemophilus parainfluenzae Rivers 1922 (Approved Lists 1980)

Species of bacterium

Haemophilus parainfluenzae is a species of Haemophilus.

It is one of the HACEK organisms. H. parainfluenzae is an opportunistic pathogen that has been associated with endocarditis, bronchitis, otitis, conjunctivitis, pneumonia, abscesses and genital tract infections.

== Natural genetic transformation ==
H. parainfluenzae biotypes I and II are capable of natural genetic transformation. Natural genetic transformation is a bacterial adaptation for DNA transfer. In order for a bacterium to bind, take up and recombine exogenous DNA into its genome it must enter a special physiological state termed natural competence. In H. parainfluenzae, competence is induced during the late stationary phase of growth. Natural DNA transformation may play a major role in the exchange of genetic information among H. parainfluenzae isolates.

== Treatment ==
Acute H. parainfluenzae infections must be treated with antibiotics. Beta-lactam agents such as amoxicillin and ampicillin are antibiotics that are effective against H. parainfluenzae. The Duration of Antibiotic Therapy depends on the severity of the infection. In 40% of infective endocarditis cases caused by H. parainfluenzae, the best treatment is a valve replacement.
