= Cockroach bite =

Rare bite occurrence from a Cockroach

- Symptoms: Swelling
- Causes: Cockroach infestation, Food scarce
- Treatment: Anti itch cream, antiseptic

A cockroach bite is a rare bite occurrence that happens when food is scarce. The cockroach will likely bite on human skin, toe nails, eyelashes, and fingernails.

== Description ==
If the cockroach finds out that food is scarce, the cockroach will try to find something to eat on, if the cockroach finds the human, they will bite the skin, toe nails, fingernails, and eyelashes. Cockroaches will do this when the human is sleeping, because the human is not active and awake to kill the cockroach. The bite can range from a pinch, to a mild arthropod bite.

== Bite ==
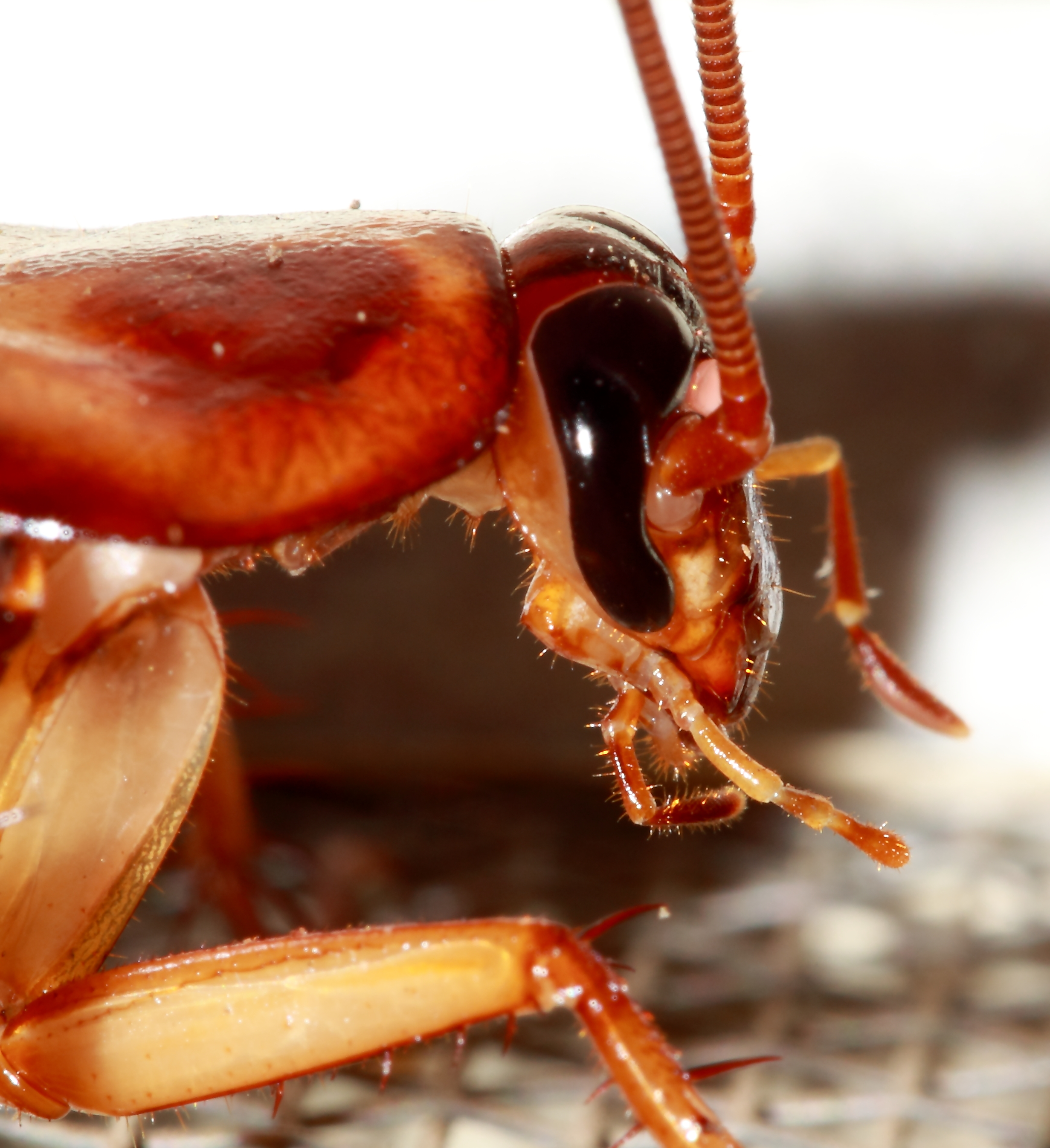
The head of the American Cockroach

the head of a Cockroach being scanned by a electron microscope which the mouth can be seen

The bite can look like an average mosquito bite, if been biten on the skin. The cockroach bite can range from a pinch, to a mild arthropod bite. A cockroach bite is considered to have a more stronger jaw then humans, which is greater then the weight of a cockroach according to researches and studies.

== Treatment ==
The treatment for a cockroach bite can be treated with soap and water for cleaning the bite and using antiseptic, and using antipruritic to reduce the itchiness.

== Studies ==
Multiple studies have shown that a cockroach bite can be fifty times more stronger due to their jaw, which is greater then the weight of a cockroach. This means that a cockroach jaw is more stronger then a human jaw which the cockroach can practically bite and chew into anything. This can practically make the bite of a cockroach cause bad mild itchiness, and pain if being biten on the skin, eyelashes, toe nails, fingernails, or rarely the eyelids. Being biten on the eyelids has happened amongst small infants which is a huge risk which happened to a 10 month old infant, and a four year old child in a London apartment which caused the four year old to develop an infection.

== See also ==
- Arthropod bites and stings
