= Interdigital dermatitis in cattle =

Bacterial disease of cattle

Interdigital dermatitis in cattle is caused by the anaerobic bacterium Dichelobacter nodosus. This is also the agent of footrot in sheep, but strains appear to be different and there is no cross-infection.

Interdigital dermatitis is different from footrot in cattle and both conditions may occur concurrently.

The condition most commonly occurs in farms with a high stocking density or where cattle traffic is high and is most prevalent in Winter.

== Clinical signs and diagnosis ==
Interdigital dermatitis appears as an infections of the skin between the claws and is usually very mild. There may be fluid or a scab in that area, and there is rarely lameness. There is then progression to the heels which become raw and cattle will experience pain. Chronic cases will show changes of the hoof including hyperplasia of the interdigital tissues and muscle atrophy in the affected limb. The horn may become underrun.

Diagnosis is principally based on history and clinical signs. It is very rare that attempts are made to isolate the bacteria.

== Treatment and control ==
The skin should be cleaned and kept dry, and topical antibiotics can be applied to the area. Systemic antibiotics are not needed.

Control relies on prompt detection, isolation and treatment of affected cattle. Footpaths should be kept as dry as possible and slurry build-up should be avoided. Regular footbaths should be organised, using formalin, copper sulphate or a thymol-based disinfectant. In 2013, a safer and alternative to chemicals for hoof baths called Thymox Technology was proven, through field testing, to kill the main bacteria causing digital dermatitis.
