= Elizabethkingia =

Scientific classification
- Domain: Bacteria
- Kingdom: Pseudomonadati
- Phylum: Bacteroidota
- Class: Flavobacteriia
- Order: Flavobacteriales
- Family: Weeksellaceae
- Genus: Elizabethkingia; Kim et al., 2005

Species
- E. anophelis; E. endophytica; E. meningoseptica; E. miricola

Genus of bacteria

Elizabethkingia is a genus of bacterium in the order of Flavobacteriales. It was established in 2005 from a branch of the genus Chryseobacterium, and named after Elizabeth O. King, the discoverer of the type species. Elizabethkingia has been found in soil, rivers, and reservoirs worldwide. The genus contains several pathogenic species, such as E. meningoseptica and E. anophelis.

== Classification ==
The genus includes four species:

- Elizabethkingia anophelis, isolated from Anopheles mosquitoes, can cause respiratory tract illness in humans, the cause of a 2016 outbreak centered in Wisconsin.
- Elizabethkingia endophytica, isolated from blemished stems of sweet corn, Zea mays
- Elizabethkingia meningoseptica, can cause outbreaks of neonatal meningitis in premature newborns and infants
- Elizabethkingia miricola, isolated from condensation water in Space Station Mir

== Epidemiology ==
A 2014 study revealed that Elizabethkingia is an emerging bacterial pathogen for hospital environments, with its incidence in intensive care units rising since 2004. About 5-10 cases of Elizabethkingia are reported per state in the United States every year. A recent study showed that incidence rates for Elizabethkingia increased by 432.1% for 2016–2017 over the incidence for 2009–2015. It possesses genes conferring antibiotic resistance and virulence. It naturally produces β-lactamases and shows intrinsic resistance to most β-lactam antibiotics, including carbapenems and aztreonam, but it may remain susceptible to piperacillin and piperacillin/tazobactam. Combined with a lack of effective therapeutic regimens, this leads to high mortality rates. Due to the growing incidence rates, lack of treatments, and high mortality rate, intensive prevention of contamination is necessary.

One of the more significant risk factors for Elizabethkingia is whether mechanical ventilation was used with the patient. Because it can form a biofilm in moist environments, water or water-related equipment can also aid in the transfer of Elizabethkinga in hospital environments.

=== In children ===
Neonatal meningitis is the most common presentation of Elizabethkingia for children. Recent studies suggest that approximately 31% of children that have Elizabethkingia pass away from the infection, with an average life expectancy of 27 days from onset of symptoms. For the children who recover from Elizabethkingia, about 48% report typical development and full recovery. 30% indicated an onset of hydrocephalus post-recovery. Many other cases included various onsets post-recovery, including motor deficits, cognitive deficits, ongoing seizures, spasticity, and/or hearing loss.

== Elizabethkingia infections in dogs and cats ==
A 2021 retrospective review of 86 Elizabethkingia veterinary diagnostic laboratory results from US dogs and cats found 26 E. meningoseptica, 1 E. miricola, and 59 unspeciated Elizabethkingia isolates from nine US states, demonstrating that Elizabethkingia infections in animals may increase risks to humans.
