= Aggregatibacter aphrophilus =

Scientific classification
- Domain: Bacteria
- Kingdom: Pseudomonadati
- Phylum: Pseudomonadota
- Class: Gammaproteobacteria
- Order: Pasteurellales
- Family: Pasteurellaceae
- Genus: Aggregatibacter
- Species: A. aphrophilus

Binomial name
- Aggregatibacter aphrophilus (Khairat 1940) Nørskov-Lauritsen and Kilian 2006

Type strain
- ATCC 33389 CCUG 3715; CIP 70.73; NCTC 5906

Synonyms
- Haemophilus paraphrophilus Zinnemann et al. 1968 (Approved Lists 1980); Haemophilus aphrophilus Khairat 1940 (Approved Lists 1980)

Species of bacterium

Aggregatibacter aphrophilus is a species of gram-negative bacteria. It is one of the HACEK organisms.
