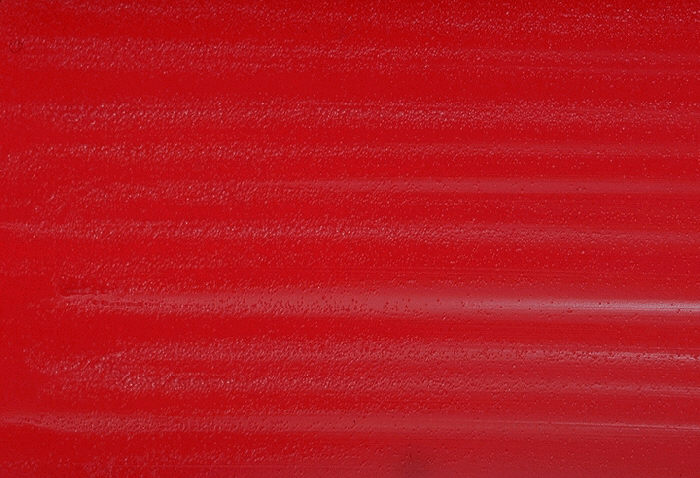
- Cardiobacterium hominis on a blood agar plate

Scientific classification
- Domain: Bacteria
- Kingdom: Pseudomonadati
- Phylum: Pseudomonadota
- Class: Gammaproteobacteria
- Order: Cardiobacteriales
- Family: Cardiobacteriaceae
- Genus: Cardiobacterium; Slotnick & Dougherty, 1964

Type species
- Cardiobacterium hominis Slotnick & Dougherty, 1964

Species
- Cardiobacterium hominis Slotnick & Dougherty, 1964; Cardiobacterium valvarum Han et al. 2004

= Cardiobacterium =

Genus of bacteria

Cardiobacterium is a genus of bacteria in the family Cardiobacteriaceae. These Gram-negative bacillus (rod-shaped) bacteria are commonly grouped with other bacteria into the HACEK group.

== Species ==
This genus includes the following species:

- Cardiobacterium hominis Slotnick & Dougherty, 1964
- Cardiobacterium valvarum Han et al. 2004
