= Aggregatibacter segnis =

Scientific classification
- Domain: Bacteria
- Kingdom: Pseudomonadati
- Phylum: Pseudomonadota
- Class: Gammaproteobacteria
- Order: Pasteurellales
- Family: Pasteurellaceae
- Genus: Aggregatibacter
- Species: A. segnis

Binomial name
- Aggregatibacter segnis (Kilian 1977) Nørskov-Lauritsen and Kilian 2006

Type strain
- ATCC 33393 CCUG 10787; CCUG 12838; CIP 103292; DSM 21418; HK316; NCTC 10977

Synonyms
- Haemophilus segnis Kilian 1977 (Approved Lists 1980)

Species of bacterium

Aggregatibacter segnis is a species of gram-negative bacteria. A. segnis can be cultured on chocolate agar.
