= Animal bite =

Wound or puncture caused by animal teeth

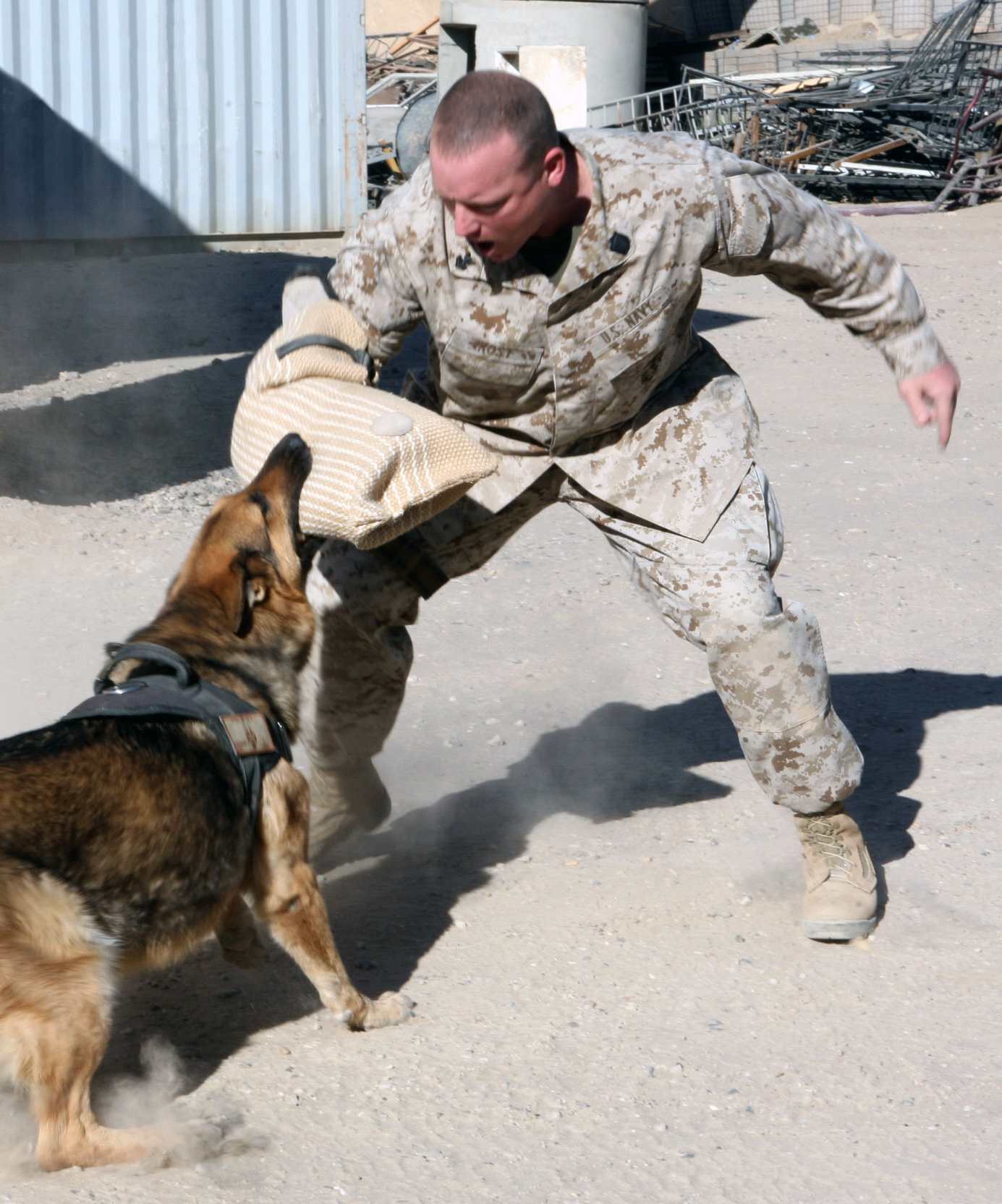
- Military working dog training to attack by biting
- Specialty: Emergency medicine

An animal bite is a wound, usually a puncture or laceration, caused by the teeth. An animal bite usually results in a break in the skin but also includes contusions from the excessive pressure on body tissue from the bite. The contusions can occur without a break in the skin. Bites can be provoked or unprovoked. Other bite attacks may be apparently unprovoked. Biting is a physical action not only describing an attack but it is a normal response in an animal as it eats, carries objects, softens and prepares food for its young, removes ectoparasites from its body surface, removes plant seeds attached to its fur or hair, scratching itself, and grooming other animals. Animal bites often result in serious infections and mortality. Animal bites not only include injuries from the teeth of reptiles, mammals, but fish, and amphibians. Arthropods can also bite and leave injuries.

== Signs and symptoms ==
Bite wounds can cause a number of signs and symptoms

- Generalized tissue damage due to tearing and scratching
- Serious hemorrhage if major blood vessels are pierced
- Infection by bacteria or other pathogens, including rabies
- Introduction of venom into the wound by venomous animals such as some snakes
- Introduction of other irritants into the wound, causing inflammation and itching

== Classification ==
Animal bites are typically classified according to the species responsible for the injury. Many different animals are known to bite humans.

=== Vertebrates ===
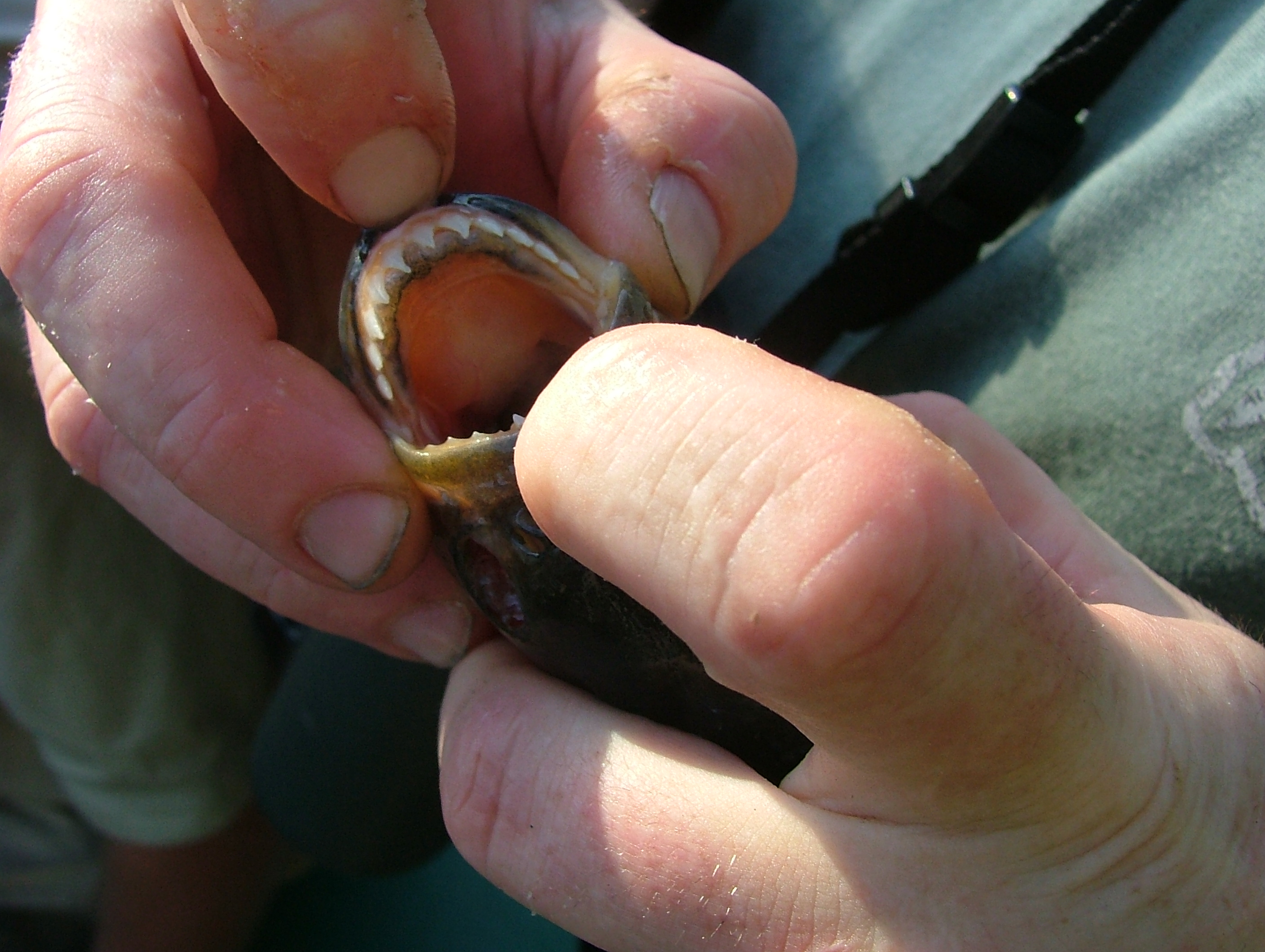
Jaw of the piranha with biting equipment displayed

- Companion animals, including dogs, cats, rats, ferrets, and parrots, may bite humans.
- Wildlife may sometimes bite humans. The bites of various mammals such as bats, skunks, wolves, raccoons, etc. may transmit rabies, which is almost always fatal if left untreated.
- Human bites are themselves capable of doing great flesh damage, but are particularly known for spreading communicable diseases

Involuntary biting injuries due to closed-fist injuries from fists striking teeth (referred to as reverse bite injuries) are a common consequence of fist fights. These have been termed "fight bites". Injuries in which the knuckle joints or tendons of the hand are bitten into tend to be the most serious.

Teething infants are known to bite objects to relieve pressure on their growing teeth, and may inadvertently bite people's hands or arms while doing so. Young children may also bite people out of anger or misbehavior, although this is usually corrected early in the child's life.

=== Closed fist (human bite) injuries ===
Human bite injuries encompass two types of injuries, "the occlusive bite with or without tissue loss... and the more common 'fight bite' or closed fist injury". In the latter—also referred to as "clenched fist" or reverse bite injuries,—"the joint capsule, the extensor tendon, or the deep fascial spaces" of the assailant's hand are at risk of contamination with oral bacteria of the individual assaulted. One review perspective from 2002 described a "classic injury pattern" from fight bite wounds as being "tooth penetration of the dorsum of the hand over the third [metacarpophalangeal (MCP) joint]", and more generally as having the injuries usually occurring

over the dorsal aspect of the third, fourth, or fifth MCP joints, an area which is susceptible to deep infection because the thin skin overlying the joint provides little protection to the underlying ligaments, synovium, and cartilage.

Closed fist injuries can occur when a person punches another individual in the mouth, causing the skin, and sometimes tendons, of the knuckles to be cut by the teeth. The wound is often located over the MCP joints and may result in tendon injury.

As of 2015, one European view of the medical treatment of this injury was as it being similar to human bites generally, but with possible damage of the underlying tendons. As of 2002, it was the report of one set of reviewers that "fight bite wounds have the highest incidence of complications of any closed fist injury and of any type of bite wound", and a 2015 primary research study reported that 62 of 147 patients "with proximal interphalangeal joint injuries" (most presenting with joint penetration) "had poor results, four requiring amputation and one a fusion".

As of the 2002 review, in particular for what were termed typical cases—patients seen 5–7 days post-injury, and presenting with "an infected wound, swelling, erythema, pain, and... limited range of [hand] motion"—treatment included "[h]and surgery consultation", with the an operation to provide "open irrigation and debridement, with subsequent admission for intravenous antibiotics", with the decision "regarding antibiotics before surgical debridement... made in concert with the hand surgeon", given their possible preference for culturing the infection intraoperatively. A 2003 research study of fifty patients, 28 with "clenched-fist injuries" and 22 with occlusional bites, most to hands, reported 27 hospitalizations, isolation of a fungal species (Candida) from four patients, and median isolates (per wound culture) of three aerobic and one anaerobic species, isolates that included Staphylococcus aureus and various other Streptococcus, Fusobacterium, Eikenella, and Prevotella species.

=== Arthropods ===
The bites of arthropods have some of the most serious health consequences known. Mosquito bites transmit serious disease and result in millions of deaths and illnesses in the world. Ticks also transmit many diseases such as Lyme disease.

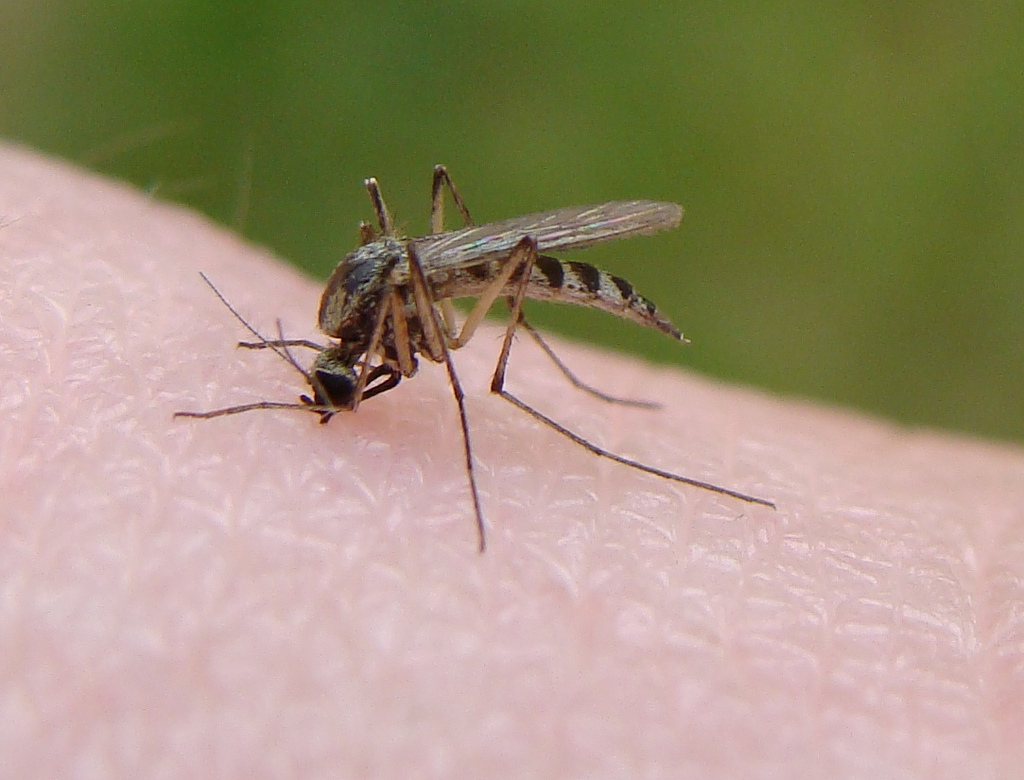
A mosquito bite

- Spider bite
- Insect bites and stings
- Cockroach bite
- Flea bites are responsible for the transmission of plague.
  - Mosquito bites are responsible for the transmission of dengue fever and malaria.
- Leech bite

== Mechanism ==
=== Trauma ===
A natural consequence of a bite is tissue trauma at the site. Trauma may consist of scratching, tearing, puncturing or laceration of the skin, hematoma (bruising), embedding of foreign objects, for example a tooth or hair, damage to or severing of underlying structures such as connective tissue or muscle, amputations, and the ripping off of skin and hair. If major blood vessels are damaged, severe blood loss can occur.

=== Infection ===
Pathogen organisms can be introduced into the bite. Some of the pathogens can originate from the mouth of the 'biter', the substrate onto which the injured person or animal can fall or from the naturally occurring microorganisms that are present on the skin or hair of the animal. The advent of antibiotics improved the outcome of bite wound infections.

=== Rabies ===
Animal bites where skin has been penetrated, most commonly by dogs and bats, transmit rabies to humans. Rabies from other animals is rare, although almost any mammal can transmit rabies to humans. At a global level, dogs are responsible for 99% of the human rabies cases, but in some countries, including the United States, most human rabies cases are acquired from bats. If the animal is caught alive or dead with its head preserved, the head can be analyzed to detect the disease. Signs of rabies include foaming at the mouth, growling, self-mutilation, jerky behavior, red eyes, and hydrophobia.

If the animal cannot be captured, preventative rabies treatment is recommended in many places. Several countries are known not to have native rabies, see the Wikipedia page for prevalence of rabies.

== Treatment ==
The first step in treatment includes washing the bite wound. If there is a low risk of infection the wound may be sutured. Debridement and drainage of bite wounds was practiced in the pre-antibiotic era, but high rates of infection still occurred. A 2019 Cochrane systematic review aimed to evaluate the healing and infection rates in bite wounds based on if/when they were stitched closed. The review authors looked for studies that compared stitching wounds closed straight away, leaving them open for a short time or not stitching them at all. Due to a lack of high-certainty evidence, the review authors concluded that more robust randomised controlled trials were needed to fully answer this question.

=== Antibiotics ===
Antibiotics to prevent infection are recommended for dog and cat bites of the hand, and human bites if they are more than superficial. They are also recommended in those who have poor immune function. Evidence for antibiotics to prevent infection in bites in other areas is not clear.

The first choice is amoxicillin with clavulanic acid, and if the person is penicillin-allergic, doxycycline and metronidazole. The antistaphylococcal penicillins (e.g., cloxacillin, nafcillin, flucloxacillin) and the macrolides (e.g., erythromycin, clarithromycin) are not used for empirical therapy, because they do not cover Pasteurella species.

=== Vaccinations ===
Rabies post-exposure prophylaxis is generally recommend in areas where the disease is prevalent (see Prevalence of rabies). Annually, over 29 million people globally receive human rabies vaccines.

Tetanus toxoid treatment is recommended in those whose vaccinations are not up to date and have a bite that punctures the skin. Tetanus immune globulin is indicated in people with more than 10 years since prior vaccination. Tetanus boosters (Td) should be given every ten years.

Prior toxoid	Clean minor wounds	All other wounds
< 3 doses	TT: yes, TIG: no	TT: yes, TIG: yes
≥ 3 doses	TT: if last dose ≥ 10yr TIG: no	TT: if last dose ≥ 5yr, TIG: no

TT = tetanus toxoid; TIG: tetanus immune globulin

=== Mosquito bites ===
Antihistamines are effective treatment for the symptoms from bites. Many diseases such as malaria and dengue are transmitted by mosquitoes.

== Epidemiology ==
Human bites are the third most frequent type of bite after dog and cat bites. Dog bites are commonplace, with children the most commonly bitten and the face and scalp the most common target. About 4.7 million dog bites are reported annually in the United States. The US estimated annual count of animal bites is 250,000 human bites, 1 to 2 million dog bites, 400,000 cat bites, and 45,000 bites from snakes. Bites from skunks, horses, squirrels, rats, rabbits, pigs, and monkeys may be up to 1 percent of bite injuries. Pet ferrets attacks that were unprovoked have caused serious facial injuries. Non-domesticated animals though assumed to be more common especially as a cause of rabies infection, make up less than one percent of reported bite wounds. When a person is bitten, it is more likely to occur on the right arm, most likely due to defensive reactions when the person uses their dominant arm. Estimates are that three-quarters of bites are located on the arms or legs of humans. Bites to the face of humans constitute only 10 percent of the total. Two-thirds of bite injuries in humans are suffered by children aged ten and younger.

Up to three-fourths of dog bites happen to those younger than 20 years-old. In the United States, the costs associated with dog bites are estimated to be more than $1 billion annually. The age groups that suffer most from dog bites are children 5 to 9 years-old. Often, bites go unreported and no medical treatment given - these bites go unreported. As many as one percent of pediatric emergency room visits are for treatment for animal bites. This is more frequent during the summer months. Up to five percent of children receiving emergency care for dog bites are then admitted to the hospital. Bites typically occur in the late afternoon and early evening. Girls are bitten more frequently by cats than they are by dogs. Boys are bitten by dogs two times more often than girls are bitten by dogs.

== History ==
The bites of humans are recorded during the biblical era. Reports of secondary infection occurring after a human bite in children have been noted in the United States since at least 1910. Morbidity and mortality rates improved with the use of antibiotics.

== See also ==
- Bite force quotient
- Wilderness first aid
- Dog bite
- Dog bite prevention
