= Elizabeth O. King =

American bacteriologist (1912–1966)

Elizabeth Osborne King
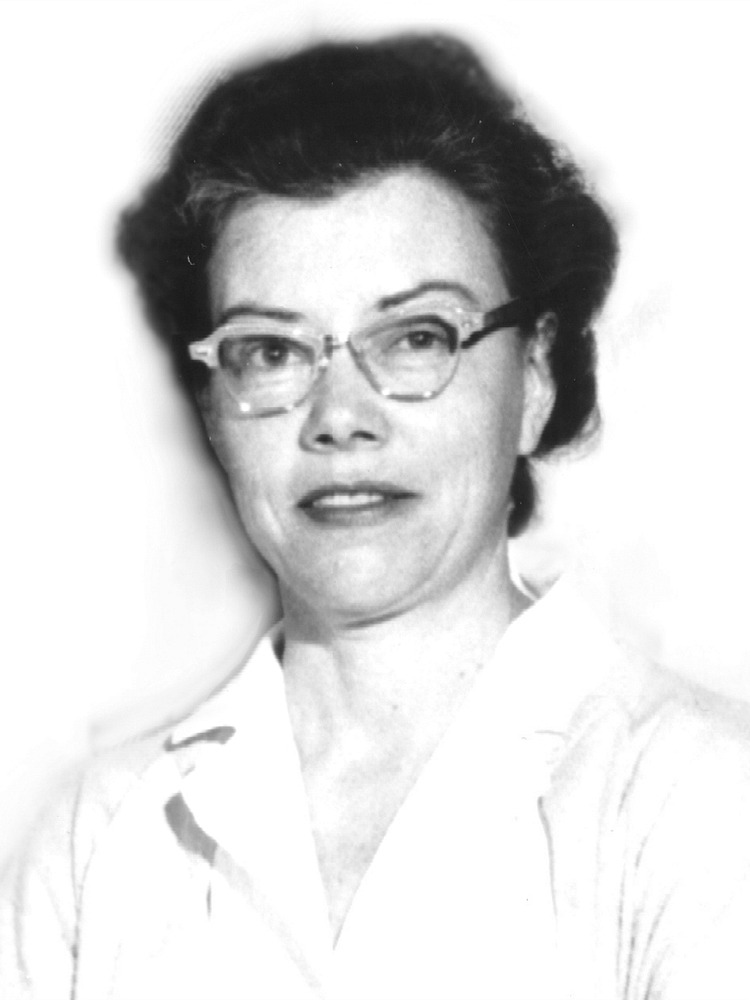
- Born: October 12, 1912; Atlanta, Georgia, U.S.
- Died: April 8, 1966 (aged 53); Atlanta, Georgia, U.S.
- Education: B.S., University of Georgia; M.S., Emory University

Elizabeth Osborne King (October 12, 1912 – April 8, 1966) was an American microbiologist who discovered and described bacteria of medical importance at the United States Centers for Disease Control and Prevention from the late 1940s through the early 1960s. A 1984 CDC manual dedication referred to King as "internationally known as an authority on a variety of unusual bacteria." The genera Kingella and Elizabethkingia and several species of bacteria are named to honor her for her pioneering work. King died of cancer on April 8, 1966, in Atlanta, where she is interred in Oakland Cemetery.

== Biography ==
Born on October 12, 1912, in Atlanta, Georgia, she earned her Bachelor of Science degree in zoology at the University of Georgia in 1935, and her Master of Science degree in medical technology at Emory University in 1938.

In 1943 she joined the Women's Army Corps and served as a commissioned officer during World War II at Fort Detrick, Frederick, Maryland. After the war, she worked at the Emory University Hospital from 1946 to 1948.

After leaving Emory University Hospital in 1948 she joined the staff of the recently founded U.S. Communicable Disease Center, now known as the Centers for Disease Control and Prevention (CDC). King initially worked in the Diphtheria Laboratory but, in 1951, transferred to the newly created General Bacteriology Laboratory, which was established to study malaria and exotic diseases brought back by servicemen in World War II. Her time in the General Bacteriology Laboratory sparked an interest in disease causing gram-negative bacillus bacteria that did not belong to the Enterobacteriaceae family. Her experience working in hospital laboratories made her aware of the challenges these poorly classified bacteria presented in a diagnostic setting, and she set out to organize these classifications.

King worked in the General Bacteriology Laboratory until her death in 1966.

== Accomplishments ==
In 1959, King identified a strain of bacilli bacteria that was responsible for an outbreak of meningitis among hospital newborns. She gave the species the name Flavobacterium meningosepticum and linked it as the source of infection in the newborns. She reported her findings in the American Journal of Clinical Pathology with her paper Studies on a Group of Previously Unclassified Bacteria Associated with Meningitis in Infants. In 1994 the species was reclassified as belonging to the Chryseobacterium genus. The species was reclassified again in 2005, this time, as part of a new genus of bacteria named Elizabethkingia in her honor. Species of this genus are responsible for meningitis infections in newborns and meningitis, bloodstream, and respiratory infections in people with compromised immune systems. Today the species first identified by King in 1959 is known as Elizabethkingia meningoseptica.

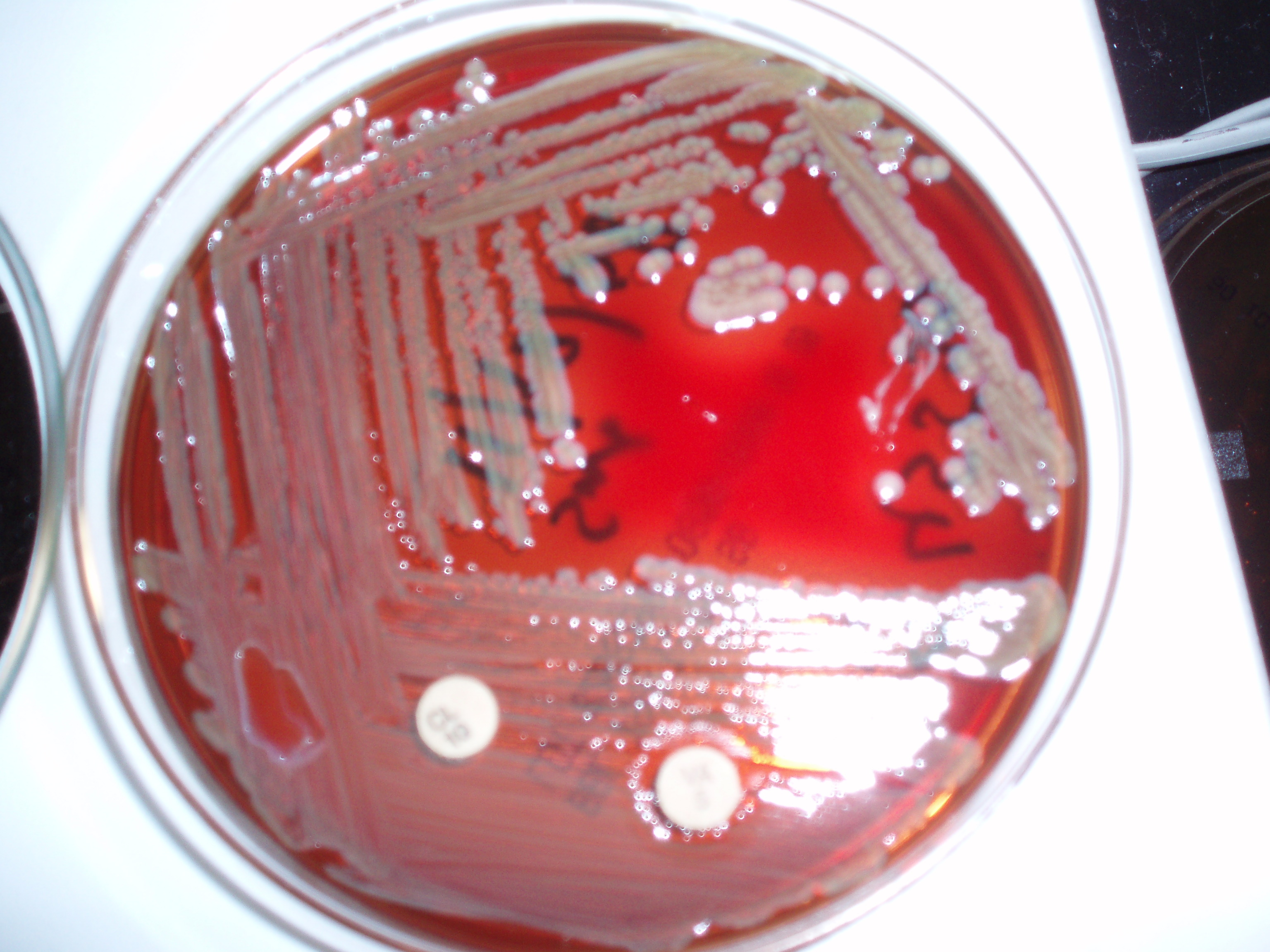
6-day-old Blood agar growth of Elizabethkingia meningioseptica with 5ug vancomycin (with a zone of clearing) and 10 ug colistin disks. This strain did not produce the flexirubin pigment. Like Burkholderia cepacia this organism can be colistin resistant and partially Vancomycin sensitive.

King specialized in systematic identification of bacteria using known cultures collected from around the world, and she propagated, froze, and stored bacterial samples for future use in identification. The information from her collection was stored on laboratory data cards developed with Dr. Martha K. Ward. Her systematic methods eventually lead to the simplified identification of other bacteria such as Actinobacter calccoaceticus (previously Herellea vaginicola), Pasteurella species, and Campylobacter fetus (previously Vibrio fetus)

In the 1960s, King identified a novel bacteria from human respiratory secretions, blood, and bone and joint exudates that was designated Moraxella kingii in her honor shortly after her death. In 1976 it was reassigned to the genus Kingella and given the species name Kingella kingae.

In 1964, she presented her work Identification of Unusual Gram-Negative Pathogenic Bacteria at the annual round table meeting of the American Society for Microbiology in Washington, D.C. The book served as a field guide for identifying bacteria and was subsequently updated several times into the 1990s.

== Honors ==
King has two genera containing bacteria she discovered that are named after her: Kingella and Elizabethkingia.

In 1970, the Southeastern Branch of the American Society for Microbiology established the Elizabeth O. King Award for notable and significant contributions in the diagnostic, public health, or medical microbiology. Qualifying contributions include publications, microbial systematics including collection, organization and interpretation of data, teaching and training, and/or evidence of superior performance as a diagnostic microbiologist.

The American Society of Microbiology gives the ASM Elizabeth O. King Lecturer Award, which recognizes exceptional accomplishments to advance science and public health.

== Notable publications ==
- Studies on a group of previously unclassified bacteria associated with meningitis in infants
  - Studies on a group of previously unclassified bacteria associated with meningitis in infants is the article in which King identified the bacterium Flavobacterium meningoseptica, the bacteria that would later come to be known as Elizabethkingia menigoseptica in King's honor.
- Listeriosis: A Public Health Problem
  - In Listeriosis: A Public Health Problem, King becomes one of the first to recognize and warn health care providers about the consequences of infection with Listeria monocytogenes.
- Human Infections with Vibrio fetus and a Closely Related Vibrio
  - Human Infections with Vibrio fetus outlines a human outbreak of a type of Vibrio infection usually only seen in cattle and the subsequent analysis of the Vibrio fetus strains causing the outbreak.
