= Elizabethkingia anophelis =

Scientific classification
- Domain: Bacteria
- Kingdom: Pseudomonadati
- Phylum: Bacteroidota
- Class: Flavobacteriia
- Order: Flavobacteriales
- Family: Weeksellaceae
- Genus: Elizabethkingia
- Species: E. anophelis

Binomial name
- Elizabethkingia anophelis Kämpfer et al. 2011

Species of bacterium

Elizabethkingia anophelis is a yellow-pigmented, rod-shaped, gram-negative bacterium from the Weeksellaceae family. E. anophelis was first isolated from the midgut of Anopheles gambiae mosquitoes. The species is one of several potentially pathogenic species in the genus Elizabethkingia and has been identified in the 2016 United States Elizabethkingia outbreak.

== Discovery ==
In 2011, Kampfer et al. isolated Elizabethkingia anophelis from the midgut of Anopheles gambiae G3 mosquitoes reared in captivity.

== Biology and biochemistry ==
=== Morphology ===
E. anophelis is a Gram-negative bacterium that appears slightly yellow and is characterized by its non-motile and non-spore-forming nature. Its cells typically have a rod-like shape and a genome size of around 4.03 Mbp, with an average GC content of 35.4%. E. anophelis is known to be a prevalent inhabitant in the gut of Anopheles gambiae mosquitoes, the primary vector of malaria, and it is also capable of causing disease in humans. In 2013, E. anophelis was identified as a human pathogen in Central Africa during an outbreak that occurred in an intensive care unit in Singapore. Both clinical cases reported multidrug resistance.

=== Metabolism ===
Elizabethkingia anophelis uses complex carbohydrates, also known as glycans, in its metabolism. It has a starch-utilization system (Sus) that includes several proteins. The bacterium's major fatty acids exhibit a complex polar lipid profile consisting of di-phosphatidylglycerol, phosphatidylinositol, the complex polar lipid profile also consists of an unknown phospholipid, and unknown polar lipids and glycolipids. E. anophelis produces several hemolysins that are thought to assist in the digestion of erythrocytes in the mosquito's gut.

The bacterium utilizes polymers by using numerous TonB-dependent transporters (TBDTs) with various substrate specificities. These transporters actively take up essential nutrients and other substrates, including but not limited to iron complexes, vitamin B12, nickel, carbohydrates, and colicin. To energize the transport process, TBDTs interact with the TonB complex, a cytoplasmic transmembrane assembly of proteins coupled with the TonB in the periplasm.

=== Antibiotic resistance ===
E. anophelis is known for its intrinsic resistance to a wide range of antibiotics due to mechanisms such as enzymatic degradation of the drug, alteration of the target drug site, and direct extrusion of the drug from the cells using efflux pumps as well as β-lactamases. The bacterium has also evolved to initiate a stress response when the cell begins to undergo oxidative stress. E. anophelis also produces OxyR regulon and antioxidants as a stress response to defend against the oxidative stress that can be associated with mosquitoes during the process of blood digestion. One study suggests that features of E. anophelis including growth, hydrogen peroxide tolerance, cell attachment, and biofilm formation are due to the presence of hemoglobin in the gut of the mosquito.

== Ecology ==
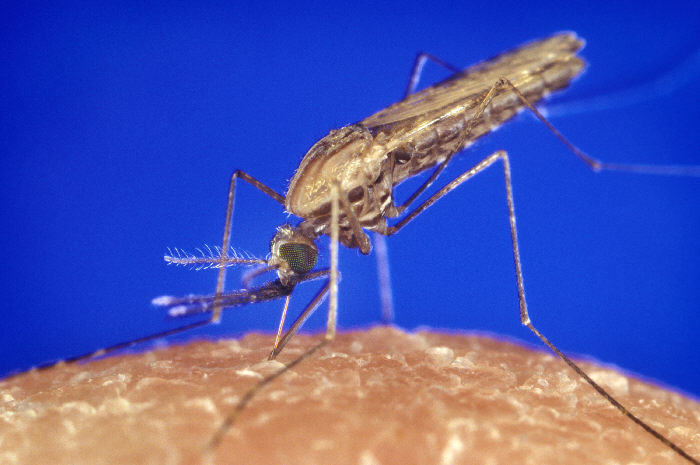
Anopheles mosquito

Elizabethkingia anophelis has a unique ecological niche, as it is primarily found in the midgut of the Anopheles mosquito, which is a known malaria vector. It is also a pathogen that can cause infections in humans, particularly those with compromised immune systems. The bacterium has a mutualistic relationship with the mosquito, where it helps digest blood meals and promote the growth of other gut microbiota. E. anophelis has also been found in diverse environments such as soil, water, and hospital settings. In hospital settings, it has been isolated from a range of sources including blood, respiratory secretions, and wounds.

The possibility of the role of mosquitoes in the maintenance and transmission of E. anophelis remains unclear.

== Role in disease ==
=== Medical importance ===
A 2014 study showed that some Elizabethkingia infections that had been attributed to Elizabethkingia meningoseptica were instead caused by Elizabethkingia anophelis. E. anophelis has been reported to cause neonatal meningitis in the Central African Republic, and a nosocomial outbreak has been reported in an intensive care unit in Singapore.

An outbreak centered in Wisconsin began in early November 2015, with 48 people confirmed infected in 12 counties and at least 18 deaths by March 9, 2016, and four new cases documented just in the week of 2–9 March 2016. By April 13, 2016, the infection had spread first to western Michigan and then to Illinois, with 61 confirmed cases and 21 deaths.

The CDC notes that the infections leading to death occurred in persons over the age of 65 who had other health conditions, leading to uncertainty as to whether E. anophelis was the cause of death, or if the cause was a combination of E. anophelis and preexisting health conditions.

=== Diagnosis ===
Cases are typically diagnosed through the culture of body fluids, most commonly blood testing.

=== Transmission ===
The transmission route remains unknown.

=== Treatment ===
The treatment of Elizabethkingia anophelis infections can vary depending on the severity of the infection and the susceptibility of the bacteria to antimicrobial agents. In general, treatment may involve the use of antibiotics E. anophelis has properties of antibiotic resistance making antibiotic susceptibility testing a must to guide the choice of antimicrobial therapy.

E. anophelis has shown resistance to many antibiotics, which can complicate the treatment plan. Some of the antibiotic resistance occurs when the bacterium is introduced to carbapenems, cephalosporins, and aminoglycosides. If deemed effective by the patient's healthcare provider an antibiotic combination may be prescribed.

In addition to antibiotics, a healthcare provider can choose to supplement care with fluids and oxygen therapy. These additives may be necessary for severely ill patients.
