= Hominis =

Hominis (genitive singular of the Latin word homō, meaning "human being") may refer to:

== Biology ==
- Blastocystis hominis, a human parasite
- Sarcoptes scabiei var. hominis, a human mite subspecies
- Staphylococcus hominis, a species of Staphylococcus found in humans

== Religion ==
- Redemptor hominis, the first encyclical written by Pope John Paul II
