= Thayer–Martin agar =

Culture medium used in microbiology

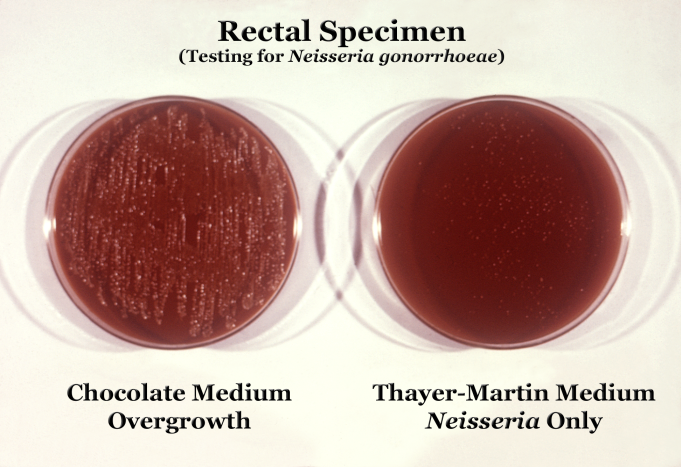
Comparison of two culture media types used to grow Neisseria gonorrhoeae bacteria. Known as overgrowth, note that the non-selective chocolate agar medium on the left, due to its composition, allowed for the growth of organismal colonies other than those of Neisseria gonorrhoeae, while the selective Thayer–Martin medium on the right, containing antimicrobials that inhibit the growth of organisms other than N. gonorrhoeae, shows no overgrowth, but is positive for N. gonorrhoeae bacteria.

Thayer–Martin agar (or Thayer–Martin medium, or VPN agar) is a Mueller–Hinton agar with 5% chocolate sheep blood and antibiotics. It is used for culturing and primarily isolating pathogenic Neisseria bacteria, including Neisseria gonorrhoeae and Neisseria meningitidis, as the medium inhibits the growth of most other microorganisms. When growing Neisseria meningitidis, one usually starts with a normally sterile body fluid (blood or cerebrospinal fluid), so a plain chocolate agar is used. Thayer–Martin agar was initially developed by James D. Thayer and John E. Martin in 1964, with an improved formulation published in 1966.

== Components ==
Thayer–Martin agar contains the following combination of antibiotics, which make up the VPN acronym:

- Vancomycin, which is able to kill most Gram-positive organisms, although some Gram-positive organisms such as Lactobacillus and Pediococcus are intrinsically resistant
- Polymyxin, also known as colistin, which is added to kill most Gram-negative organisms except Neisseria, although some other Gram-negative organisms such as Legionella are also resistant
- Nystatin, which can kill most fungi
- Trimethoprim inhibits swarming of Proteus species

== Clinical implications ==
A negative culture on Thayer–Martin in a patient exhibiting symptoms of pelvic inflammatory disease most likely indicates an infection with Chlamydia trachomatis.
