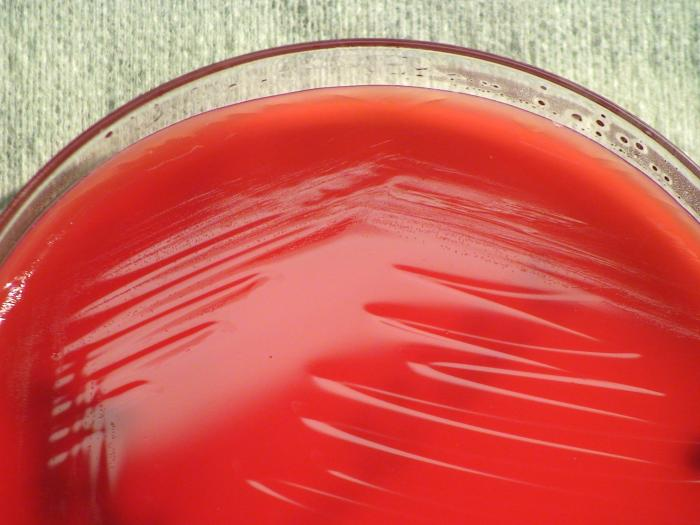
- Kingella kingae in sheep blood agar

Scientific classification
- Domain: Bacteria
- Kingdom: Pseudomonadati
- Phylum: Pseudomonadota
- Class: Betaproteobacteria
- Order: Neisseriales
- Family: Neisseriaceae
- Genus: Kingella; Henriksen and Bøvre 1976

= Kingella =

Genus of bacteria

Kingella is a genus of bacteria of the family Neisseriaceae. It belongs to the HACEK group of fastidious Gram-negative bacteria that tend to cause endocarditis. Kingella kingae is its type species.

== Species ==
As of 2021, five species belong to the genus:

- Kingella denitrificans Snell & Lapage 1976
- Kingella kingae (Henriksen & Bøvre 1968) Henriksen & Bøvre 1976
- Kingella negevensis El Houmami et al. 2017
- Kingella oralis corrig. Dewhirst et al. 1993
- Kingella potus Lawson et al. 2005
