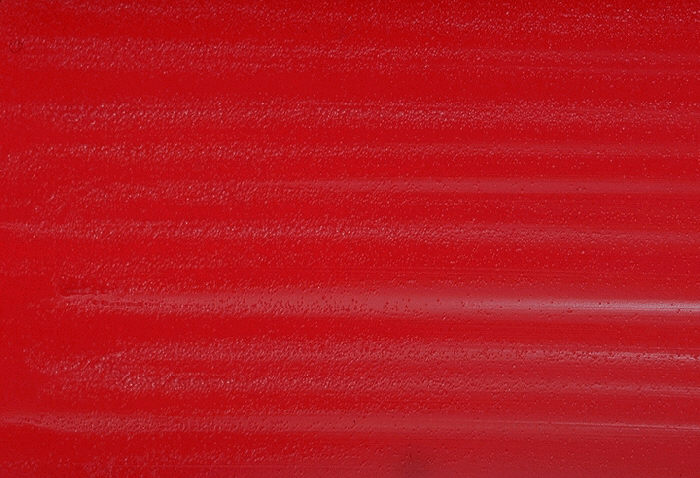
- Cardiobacterium hominis on a blood agar plate

Scientific classification
- Domain: Bacteria
- Kingdom: Pseudomonadati
- Phylum: Pseudomonadota
- Class: Gammaproteobacteria
- Order: Cardiobacteriales
- Family: Cardiobacteriaceae; Dewhirst et al. 1990

Type species
- Cardiobacterium hominis Slotnick and Dougherty 1964 (Approved Lists 1980)

Genera
- Cardiobacterium Slotnick and Dougherty 1964 (Approved Lists 1980); Dichelobacter Dewhirst et al. 1990; "Rappaport"; Suttonella Dewhirst et al. 1990

= Cardiobacteriaceae =

Family of bacteria

The Cardiobacteriaceae are a family of Pseudomonadota, given their own order. They are Gram-negative and rod-shaped, with diameters around 0.5 to 1.7 μm and lengths from 1–6 μm.
