= Chocolate agar =

Growth medium

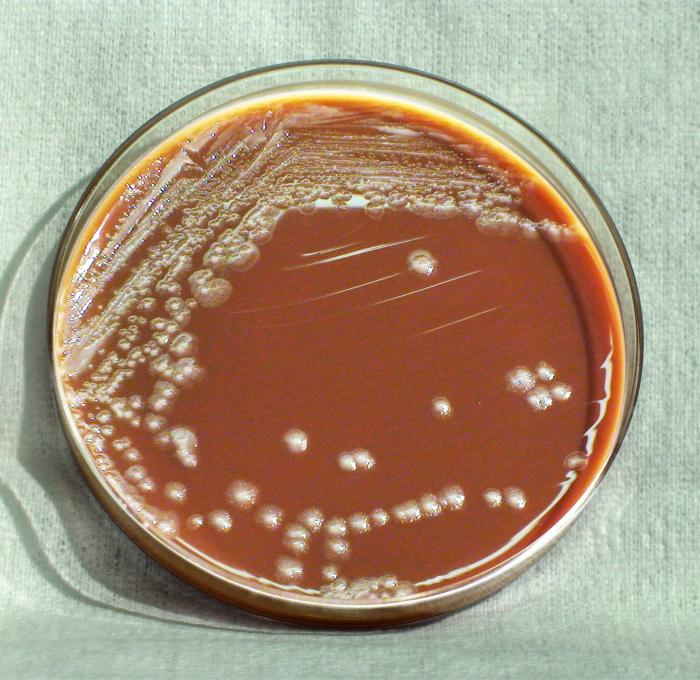
Colonies of Yersinia pestis growing on chocolate agar

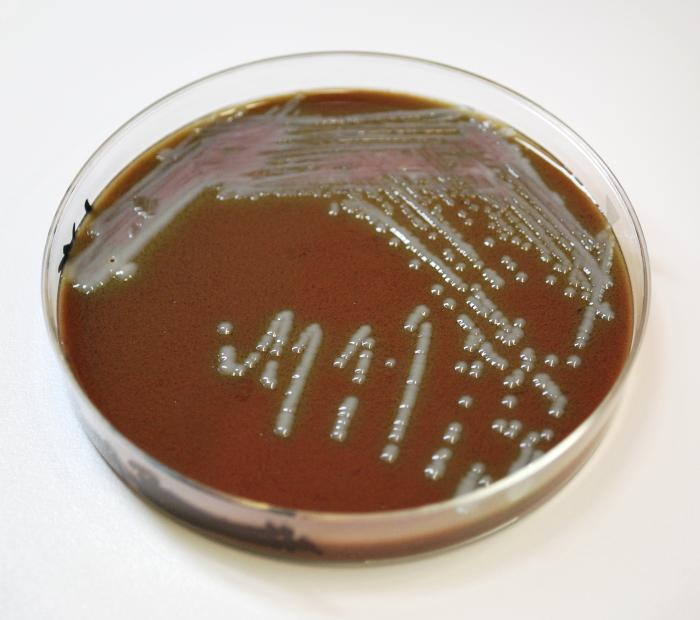
Chocolate agar showing Francisella tularensis colonies

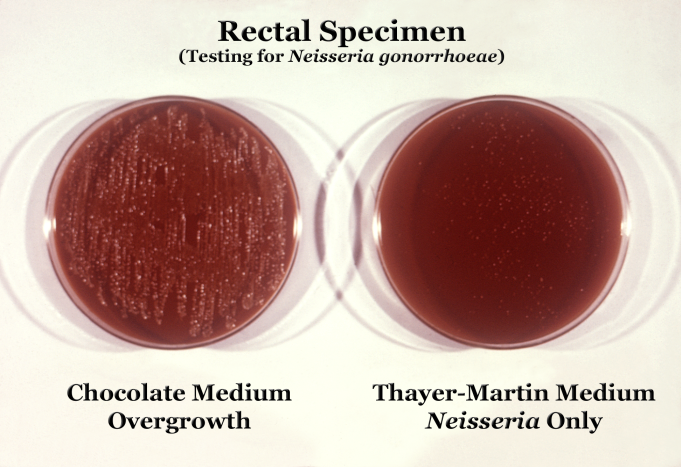
Comparison of two culture media types used to grow Neisseria gonorrhoeae bacteria. Known as overgrowth, the nonselective chocolate agar medium on the left, due to its composition, allowed for the growth of organismal colonies other than those of N. gonorrhoeae, while the selective Thayer–Martin medium on the right, containing antimicrobials that inhibit the growth of organisms other than N. gonorrhoeae, shows no overgrowth, but is positive for N. gonorrhoeae bacteria. (Enlarge image to see N. gonorrhoeae colonies)

Chocolate agar (CHOC) or chocolate blood agar (CBA) is a nonselective, enriched growth medium used for isolation of pathogenic bacteria. It is a variant of the blood agar plate, containing red blood cells that have been lysed by slowly heating to 80 °C. Chocolate agar is used for growing fastidious respiratory bacteria, such as Haemophilus influenzae and Neisseria meningitidis. In addition, some of these bacteria, most notably H. influenzae, need growth factors such as nicotinamide adenine dinucleotide (factor V or NAD) and hemin (factor X), which are inside red blood cells; thus, a prerequisite to growth for these bacteria is the presence of red blood cell lysates. The heat also inactivates enzymes which could otherwise degrade NAD. The agar is named for its color and contains no chocolate products.

== Variants ==
Chocolate agar with the addition of bacitracin becomes selective for the genus Haemophilus. Another variant of chocolate agar called Thayer–Martin agar contains an assortment of antibiotics that select for Neisseria species.

== Composition ==
The composition of chocolate agar includes the following components:

Ingredient	Quantity (grams per liter)	Purpose
Casein/Animal Tissue Digest	15.0 grams	Source of amino acids and peptides for bacterial growth.
Cornstarch	1.0 grams	Provides carbohydrates as an energy source for bacteria.
Sodium Chloride	5.0 grams	Maintains osmotic balance in the medium.
Dipotassium Phosphate	4.0 grams	Acts as a pH buffer to maintain the desired pH for bacterial growth.
Monopotassium Phosphate	1.0 grams	Acts as a pH buffer to maintain the desired pH for bacterial growth.
Hemoglobin Solution 2%	500 ml	Provides iron and other nutrients necessary for bacterial growth.
Coenzyme Enrichment	10 ml	Contains coenzymes needed for specific metabolic pathways of bacteria.
Agar	10 grams	Solidifying agent that allows the medium to form a solid surface for bacterial growth.

The exact concentrations of these ingredients may vary slightly depending on the specific formulation used in different laboratories or by different manufacturers.

== History ==
Addition of heated blood to media was first documented for use by Cohen and Fitzgerald in 1910 and then by Dr. Olga Povitzky at the New York City Department of Health Bureau of Laboratories. The term "chocolate" comes from the brown color generated from the higher concentration of heated blood in the mixture and was first used by Warren Crowe in 1915.
