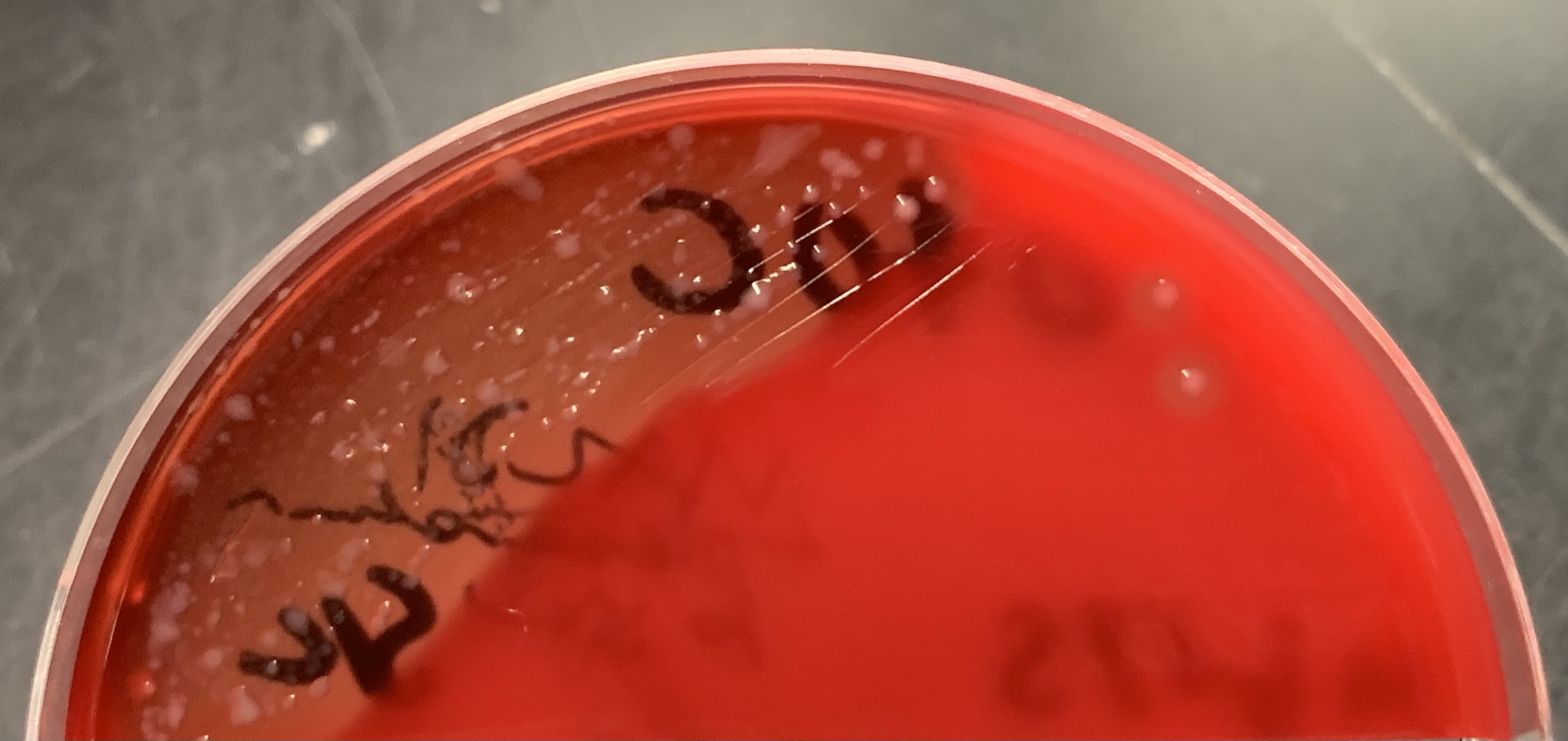

Scientific classification
- Domain: Bacteria
- Kingdom: Pseudomonadati
- Phylum: Pseudomonadota
- Class: Betaproteobacteria
- Order: Neisseriales
- Family: Neisseriaceae
- Genus: Kingella
- Species: K. kingae

Binomial name
- Kingella kingae (Henriksen and Bøvre 1968) Henriksen and Bøvre 1976

= Kingella kingae =

Species of bacterium

Kingella kingae is a species of Gram-negative facultative anaerobic β-hemolytic coccobacilli. First isolated in 1960 by Elizabeth O. King, it was not recognized as a significant cause of infection in young children until the 1990s, when culture techniques had improved enough for it to be recognized. It is best known as a cause of osteomyelitis, spondylodiscitis, septic arthritis, bacteraemia, and endocarditis, and less frequently lower respiratory tract infections and meningitis. The organism was previously known as Moraxella kingae before being reclassified in 1976.

There are currently 5 taxa under the Kingella genus: K. kingae, the most common cause of osteoarticular infections in children under 4, is part of the normal bacterial flora of the throat in young children and is transmitted from child to child. When it causes disease, the clinical presentation is often subtle and preceded by a recent history of stomatitis or upper respiratory infection. Other species are K. potus, K. negevenis, K. denitrificans (causing endocarditis in rare cases) and K. oralis both found in dental plaque.

One notable exception is in cases of endocarditis (heart valve infection), which can be more refractory to treatment. K. kingae is the fifth member of the HACEK group that causes endocarditis. Routine laboratory tests may be normal because the organism is difficult to culture. Transferring the fluid from infected joints directly into blood culture vials can enhance the chances of an accurate culture. Even after a successful culture, Kingella kingae can respond abnormally to the Gram-staining process, and it can require more extensive testing before diagnosis.

== Microbiology ==
Kingella kingae cells under a microscope are plump rods or coccobacilli that are typically seen in pairs or chains. Each cell can range from approximately 0.7 µm wide and 1.5-2.5 µm long. This bacterium is fastidious and grows poorly on many standard solid culture media, so 5% blood agar or chocolate agar plates are used to exhibit culture growth. However, Kingella kingae is typically inoculated into an aerobic blood culture system for better results, especially if solid media is not successful. PCR and other nucleic acid amplification techniques can also be used.

When successfully cultured onto a 5% horse-blood agar plate, Kingella kingae showed a thin zone of beta-hemolysis or complete lysis of red blood cells. Specific strains of the bacterium also exhibited agar corrosion which created depressions in the plate. The optimal temperature for this bacterium is approximately 35°C with growth decreasing until little or no growth is shown around 22°C. It experiences good growth in oxygenated environments but can still reproduce in anaerobic conditions, meaning the organism is facultatively anaerobic. Certain strains produce better growth in anaerobic conditions than others.

Kingella kingae is a Gram-negative bacterium. Despite having a Gram-negative cell wall structure, the microbe is resistant to decolorizing agents, so it may repeatedly produce a false Gram-positive identification during the Gram-staining process. Electron microscopy can be used to determine an accurate cell envelope structure. Kingella kingae is oxidase-positive, catalase-negative, urease-negative, and indole-negative. The organism also produces acid in the presence of glucose and maltose, but not other sugars. Earlier studies of the bacterium often classified Kingella kingae as non-motile, but more recent findings suggest the presence of the PilC1 MIDAS motif, associated with the type IV pili, is required for twitching motility.

== Pathogenesis ==
=== Colonization ===
Kingella kingae can colonize the oropharynx of young children without necessarily causing symptoms or an invasive infection. Peak colonization occurs between 12 to 24 months of age, while invasive infections are more common in those younger than 18 months. As children get older and their immune systems develop greater protection against bacterial invasion of tissues and entry into the bloodstream, they may still carry K. kingae in their throats. Thus, protection against invasion develops before protection against colonization, which may contribute to the decline in invasive infection with increasing age.

Kingella kingae expresses type IV pili, which allow for motility, natural competence, and enhanced adhesion to respiratory epithelial and synovial cells, thus increasing the likelihood of colonization. These pili have also been shown to be reduced in number as pathogenesis progresses. The sigma factor, σ54, regulates the transcription of pilA1, a major pilus subunit. PilS and PilR, regulatory transcription factors best known from the Pseudomonas aeruginosa pilus system, also may regulate pilA expression. High levels of type IV pili on K. kingae are associated with spreading/corroding colony types, while low levels of type IV pili are associated with nonspreading/noncorroding colony types of K. kingae. Along with the major type IV pili subunit, Kingella kingae expresses multiple minor pilins that optimize surface piliation and improve the adherence and twitching motility for the bacterium. The three different types of populations are spreading/corroding (with high-density piliation), nonspreading/noncorroding colonies (low-density piliation), and domed colonies (no piliation, and thus no adherence to epithelium). Generally, respiratory and nonendocarditis infections tend to be highly piliated, while joint fluid, bone, and endocarditis blood isolates are less piliated, if at all.

=== Infection ===
The infection process of Kingella kingae begins with the bacterium attacking the respiratory tract, specifically the oropharynx. For the bacterium to spread to different parts of the body, it must first enter the bloodstream by breaking through the epithelial tissue layer. One virulence factor that allows Kingella kingae to enter the bloodstream is the repeat-in-toxins (RTX) system.The RTX system is composed of different genes like rtxA, rtxB, rtxC. These specific genes serve different roles in the infection process of Kingella kingae. The most important gene is rtxA, which encodes the toxin. RtxA is cytotoxic to epithelial cells, which line the upper respiratory tract, synovial cells, and endothelial cells. By using membrane-bound cholesterol on the epithelial cells of the respiratory tract as an anchor, the toxin can create a channel in the membrane, which causes cell lysis. This damage opens a gap for the toxin to enter the bloodstream and spread to the rest of the host's cells.

== Age-association ==
K. kingae infections primarily affect children aged 6 to 36 months due to the immaturity of their immune systems. During the first 6 months of life, infants have some passive, natural immunity maternally transferred, but these antibodies gradually decline. The bacterium easily spreads among these children as they come into close contact with other children in community settings.

Carriage in adults has not been studied as extensively as colonization in children. Although K. kingae primarily affects young children, healthy adults can carry the bacterium asymptomatically. A study involving 228 healthy adults reported an overall carriage rate of 2.2%, which increased to 8.8% among adults living with children younger than 4 years. Invasive infections are still possible in adults, particularly in those who are immunocompromised or have underlying medical conditions.

== Diseases ==
=== Spondylodiscitis ===
K. kingae has been implicated as a cause of spondylodiscitis, which is an infection that involves the intervertebral disc and adjacent vertebrae, in children between the range of 6-48 months of age. In this range, the infection commonly presents with mild clinical signs and without fever, though few cases did present with fever. The lumbar region is the most commonly affected area of the body, and a delay of around 3 weeks has been seen between symptom onset and diagnosis.

Identifying K. kingae in cases of spondylodiscitis can be difficult because frequently used blood cultures tend to fail to detect the presence of the microbe. PCR performed on oropharyngeal swabs is an alternative method of detection and has been found to improve detection of K. kingae. Plasma microbial cell-free DNA sequencing is another alternative detection method found to potentially help identify K. kingae. Invasive testing, like vertebral or disc biopsies, is low-yield for detection, so molecular testing may be a more reliable detection method for K. kingae in spinal infections.

=== Osteomyelitis ===
Osteomyelitis, an infection of the bone, is another infection that is associated with K. kingae, and is seen in children. K. kingae osteomyelitis is most commonly seen in young children, mostly those younger than 4 years of age. This infection could also be paired with acute bacterial arthritis. Fever is not common in children with K. kingae infection, and inflammatory markers are usually normal or only mildly elevated. Functional impairment is also a common symptom of primary subacute hematogenous osteomyelitis.

Because conventional culture methods tend to fail to identify K. kingae, diagnosing K. kingae osteomyelitis can be difficult. PCR testing can improve detection of the bacterium, including in cases where conventional cultures are negative. Low detection rates can also be seen from conventional blood and bone cultures, while PCR identification had high detection. It was also found that using MRI for detection of osteomyelitis lesions was very effective. MRI detected all lesions examined, but conventional X-rays detected less than half.

== Treatment ==
The treatment of Kingella kingae consists of different antibiotics over a span of two main clinical stages, intravenous therapy stage and an oral antibiotic therapy stage. The bacterium have been shown to be susceptible to many different and commonly used antibiotics in clinical settings. The antibiotics that are used include amoxicillin, cephalexin, cefuroxime, which are all Beta-lactam drugs. Beta-lactam antibiotics block synthesis of peptidoglycan in the bacterial cell wall. Specifically, the antibiotics bind to the transpeptidase and inhibit the crosslinking of NAM subunits together.An antibiotic that is commonly proven to be ineffective is vancomycin, which does not work because it targets the peptidoglycan layer in the cell wall which is protected by the outer membrane due to K. kingae being a Gram-negative bacterium.

=== Intravenous administration stage ===
The first stage in Kingella kingae treatment is the administration of antibiotics via intravenous therapy. IV administration allows for the antibiotic to spread quickly through the bloodstream to reach the joint and bone infections. After initial intravenous treatment, patients may transition to oral amoxicillin or other beta-lactams.

=== Oral antibiotics stage ===
The second stage in the treatment process is the oral administration of antibiotics. Unfortunately, the bacterium is resistant to many common empiric drugs because of natural resistance or enzyme production. For example, K. kingae can possess a beta-lactamase enzyme that can break down the antibiotics making them ineffective, but if the antibiotic is paired with clavulanic acid, it can be effective. In Osteroarticular treatments, the bacterium is highly susceptible to beta-lactams paired with these enzyme blockers. The recommended class of drugs for this stage is cefuroxime, amoxicillin clavulanate, and cefadroxil.

== Prevention ==
Children in settings where they are in close proximity to each other, such as a daycare, tend to have higher rates of carriage along with transmission. In children who were not attending daycare, carriage rates declined dramatically, which suggests that transmission rates may increase in daycare settings.

In cases where K. kingae outbreaks have occurred, young children who were colonized were given amoxicillin paired with rifampicin prophylaxis in an attempt to stop the outbreak. After prophylaxis was offered to the children, the decolonization rate was above half; however, this does not mean that carriage was completely eliminated. No new invasive cases were found during the following year, but the overall effect of prophylaxis remains uncertain.
