= Aggregatibacter =

Scientific classification
- Domain: Bacteria
- Kingdom: Pseudomonadati
- Phylum: Pseudomonadota
- Class: Gammaproteobacteria
- Order: Pasteurellales
- Family: Pasteurellaceae
- Genus: Aggregatibacter; Nørskov-Lauritsen and Kilian, 2006

Type species
- Aggregatibacter actinomycetemcomitans

Genus of bacteria

Aggregatibacter is a genus in the phylum Pseudomonadota (Bacteria), which contains three species, namely:

- A. actinomycetemcomitans (Klinger 1912) Nørskov-Lauritsen and Kilian 2006, (type species of the genus); (from Greek noun aktis, aktinos (ἀκτίς, ἀκτῖνος), a beam; Greek mukēs -ētos, mushroom or other fungus; Neo-Latin actinomyces -etis, an actinomycete; Latin comitans, accompanying; Neo-Latin actinomycetemcomitans, accompanying an actinomycete)
- A. aphrophilus (Khairat 1940) Nørskov-Lauritsen and Kilian 2006, (from Ancient Greek aphros, foam; New Latin philus from Greek philos (φίλος) meaning friend, loving; New Latin aphrophilus, foam-loving)
- A. segnis (Kilian 1977) Nørskov-Lauritsen and Kilian 2006, (from Latin segnis, slow, sluggish, inactive)
