= 2016 United States Elizabethkingia outbreak =

Disease outbreak in the United States

2016 United States Elizabethkingia anophelis outbreak
- Wisconsin, in red, the location of 63 confirmed cases as of June 16, 2016
- Pathogen: Elizabethkingia anophelis
- Location: Wisconsin, western Michigan, and Illinois, United States
- Date: November 1, 2015 — May 30, 2016
- Type: Disease outbreak
- Confirmed cases: Cases / Deaths (as of June 16, 2016); Wisconsin: 63 / 18; Michigan: 1 / 1; Illinois: 1 / 1
- Deaths: 20

An outbreak of Elizabethkingia anophelis infections centered in Wisconsin is thought to have led to the death of at least 20 people in Wisconsin, Michigan, and Illinois.

== History ==
As of March 2016, it was reported to be the largest outbreak of Elizabethkingia anophelis-caused disease investigated by the Centers for Disease Control and Prevention (CDC).

Human infections by E. anophelis involve the bloodstream. Signs and symptoms can include fever, shortness of breath, chills, and cellulitis. Confirmation requires a laboratory test.

Statewide surveillance of the situation in Wisconsin was organized on January 5, 2016. Cases had been reported from Columbia, Dane, Dodge, Fond du Lac, Jefferson, Milwaukee, Ozaukee, Racine, Sauk, Sheboygan, Washington, Waukesha, and Winnebago Counties); Illinois; and western Michigan as of April 13, 2016.

Between November 1, 2015 and March 30, 2016, 62 cases of E. anophelis infections were reported to the Wisconsin Department of Health Services, Division of Public Health.

The severity of the outbreak is reflected in a statement by the CDC that "the agency sees a handful of Elizabethkingia infections around the country each year, but the outbreaks rarely involve more than a couple of cases at a time. To have dozens of cases at once — and more than a third of them possibly fatal — is startling".

In 2017, genomics researchers determined that "a disrupted DNA repair mutY gene [...] probably contributed to the high evolutionary rate of the outbreak strain and may have increased its adaptability," but the source was not identified.
