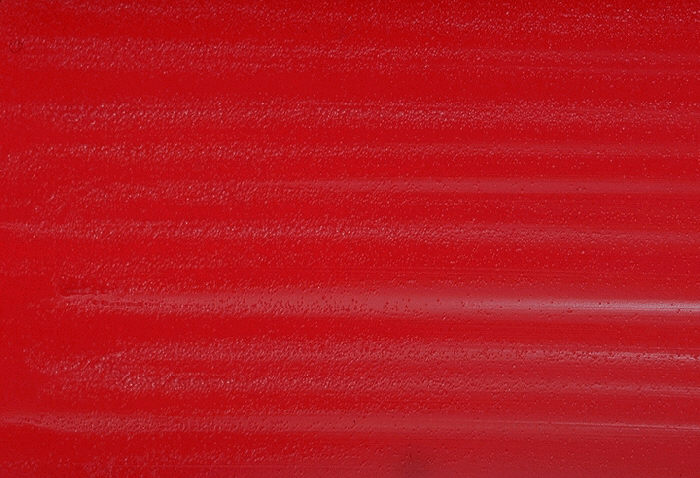
- Cardiobacterium hominis on a blood agar plate

Scientific classification
- Domain: Bacteria
- Kingdom: Pseudomonadati
- Phylum: Pseudomonadota
- Class: Gammaproteobacteria
- Order: Cardiobacteriales; Garrity et al. 2005

Type genus
- Cardiobacterium Slotnick and Dougherty 1964 (Approved Lists 1980)

Families
- Cardiobacteriaceae Dewhirst et al. 1990; Ignatzschineriaceae Montecillo 2023; Ostreibacteriaceae Wang et al. 2021

Synonyms
- Wohlfahrtiimonadaceae Chuvochina et al. 2024

= Cardiobacteriales =

Order of gammaproteobacteria

The Cardiobacteriales are an order of Pseudomonadota. Like other Proteobacteria, they are Gram-negative and rod-shaped. The order is better known for including the pathogenic HACEK organisms Cardiobacterium hominis and Cardiobacterium valvarum.

== Etymology ==
The Cardiobacteriales take their name from the original type genus Cardiobacterium first described in 1964, when C. hominis was isolated as a pathogenic species from human cases of endocarditis.

The name is formed from Cardiobacterium ("heart bacterium") + -ales ("order (of)").
