= Fastidious organism =

Organism with complex nutritional requirement

A fastidious organism is any organism that has complex or particular nutritional requirements. In other words, a fastidious organism will only grow when specific nutrients are included in its medium. The more restrictive term fastidious microorganism is used in microbiology to describe microorganisms that will grow only if special nutrients are present in their culture medium. Thus fastidiousness is often practically defined as being difficult to culture, by any method yet tried.

== Examples ==
An example of a fastidious bacterium is Neisseria gonorrhoeae, which requires blood or hemoglobin and several amino acids and vitamins to grow. Other examples include Campylobacter spp. and Helicobacter spp., which are capnophilic – require elevated CO_{2} – among other requirements. Fastidious organisms are not inherently "weak"—they can flourish and thrive in their particular ecological niche with its particular nutrients, temperature, and absence of competitors, and they can be quite difficult to kill off. But they are difficult to culture simply because it is difficult to accurately simulate their natural milieu in a culture medium. For example, Treponema pallidum is not easy to culture, yet it is resilient in its preferred environment, being difficult to eradicate from all tissues of a person with syphilis.

== Significance ==
An example of the practical relevance of fastidiousness is that a negative culture result could be a false negative; that is, just because culturing failed to produce the organism of interest does not mean that the organism was absent from either the sample, the place where the sample came from, or both. This means that the sensitivity of the test is less than perfect. So, for example, culture alone may not be enough to help a doctor trying to find out which bacteria is causing pneumonia or sepsis in a hospitalized patient, and therefore which antibiotic to use. When there is a need to determine which bacteria or fungi are present (in agriculture, medicine, or biotechnology), scientists can also turn to other tools besides cultures, such as nucleic acid tests (which instead detect that organism's DNA or RNA, even if only in fragments or spores as opposed to entire cells) or immunologic tests (which instead detect its antigens, even if only in fragments or spores as opposed to entire cells). The latter tests may be helpful in addition to (or instead of) culture, although circumspection is required in interpreting their results, too, because the DNA, RNA, and antigens of many different bacteria and fungi are often much more prevalent (in air, soil, water, and human bodies) than is popularly imagined—at least in tiny amounts. So a positive on those tests can sometimes be a false positive regarding the important distinction of infection versus just colonization or ungerminated spores. (The same problem also causes confounding errors in DNA testing in forensics; tiny amounts of one's DNA can end up almost anywhere, such as in transfer by fomites, and because modern tests can recover such tiny amounts, the interpretation of their presence requires due circumspection.) Such considerations are why skill is needed in deciding which test is appropriate to use in a given situation and in interpreting the results.

== Types of fastidiousness ==
Some microbial species' requirements for life include not only particular nutrients but chemical signals of various kinds, some of which depend, both directly and indirectly, on other species being nearby. Thus not only nutrient requirements but other chemical requirements can stand in the way of culturing species in isolation.

== Philosophical considerations ==
Lewis Thomas put fastidiousness and the challenge of culturing isolates into logical context in his 1974 book Lives of a Cell: "It has been estimated that we probably have real knowledge of only a small proportion of the microbes of the earth, because most of them cannot be cultivated alone. They live together in dense, interdependent communities, feeding and supporting the environment for each other, regulating the balance of populations between different species by a complex system of chemical signals. With our present technology, we can no more isolate one from the rest, and rear it alone, than we can keep a single bee from drying up like a desquamated cell when removed from his hive." One of the logical corollaries of this passage is that the inseparability of many species from their native ecological contexts is quite natural and reflects only the ubiquity of interdependencies in ecological systems—not any weakness, frailty, stubbornness, or rarity of any species.

Regarding Lewis's point about the limits of humans' ability to discover greater knowledge of microbes—from individual species and strains to whole microbial communities—another pair of facts is relevant. On one hand, it is true that in the decades since he wrote Lives of a Cell, the development of omics, made possible by greatly increased throughput of sequencing and digital analytics of the resultant data, has greatly expanded humans' ability to learn more about microbes because their aggregated biochemical footprints and fingerprints, as it were, can now be analyzed and quantified (for example, genomics, microbiomics, metabolomics, and metagenomics/ecogenomics). But on the other hand, for learning more about prokaryotes, the limits of culturing are still relevant even after the -omics revolution, for about the same reason that in eukaryote pathology, cytopathology still needs histopathology as its whole-tissue counterpart: there are things we can learn from whole microbial cells that we can't learn from their constituent molecules alone, just as there are things we can learn from whole eukaryotic tissues that we can't learn from their constituent cells alone (for example, the limits of aspiration cytology alone versus histopathology in concert).
