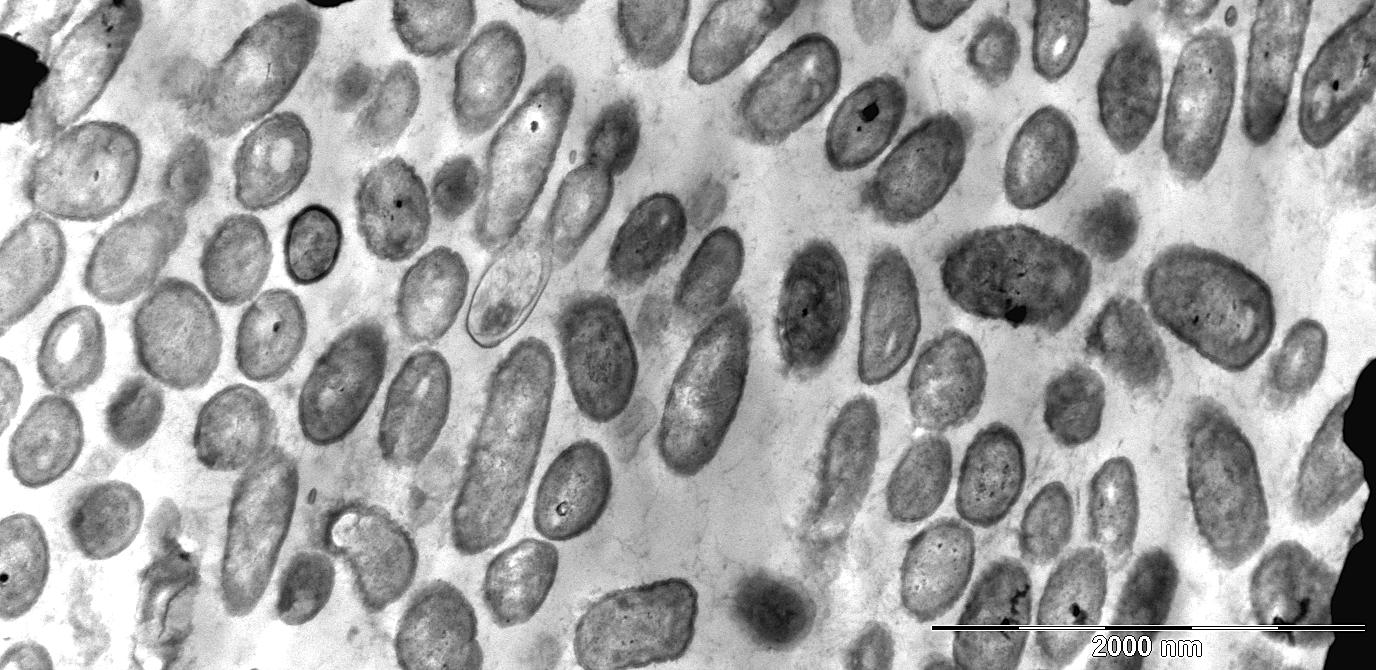
- Snodgrassella alvi, electron micrograph

Scientific classification
- Domain: Bacteria
- Kingdom: Pseudomonadati
- Phylum: Pseudomonadota
- Class: Betaproteobacteria
- Order: Neisseriales
- Family: Neisseriaceae
- Genus: Snodgrassella
- Species: S. alvi

Binomial name
- Snodgrassella alvi Kwong and Moran 2013

= Snodgrassella alvi =

Species of bacterium

Snodgrassella alvi is a species of Gram-negative bacteria within the Neisseriaceae and was previously the only known species of the genus Snodgrassella. It was isolated and scientifically described in 2012 by Waldan K. Kwong and Nancy A. Moran, who named the bacteria after the American entomologist Robert Evans Snodgrass.

Snodgrassella alvi lives symbiotically as part of the intestinal flora in the midgut of honeybees (Apis mellifera) and some social bumblebee species. In this section of the intestine, together with Gilliamella apicola, they are the dominant bacteria, with each representing up to nearly 40% of the microflora there. In the intestine, Snodgrassella alvi and Gilliamella apicola interact in the utilization of metabolic resources, using each other's metabolites, and accordingly, they colonize different areas of the intestinal wall.

According to a study published in September 2018, Snodgrassella alvi is damaged by the use of the pesticide glyphosate, resulting in impairments of the gut microbiota. As a result, weakening of the bees' resistance to harmful bacteria and subsequent weakening of the animals was observed. This effect was subsequently discussed internationally in various media as a possible cause of the colony collapse disorder observed worldwide.

== Characteristics ==
=== Appearance ===
Snodgrassella alvi is a bacterial species and thus a unicellular organism without a nucleus (prokaryote). The individual cells are short and rod-shaped with a length of about 1.0 μm and a diameter of 0.4 μm. They are gram-negative and accordingly possess only a thin peptidoglycan envelope.

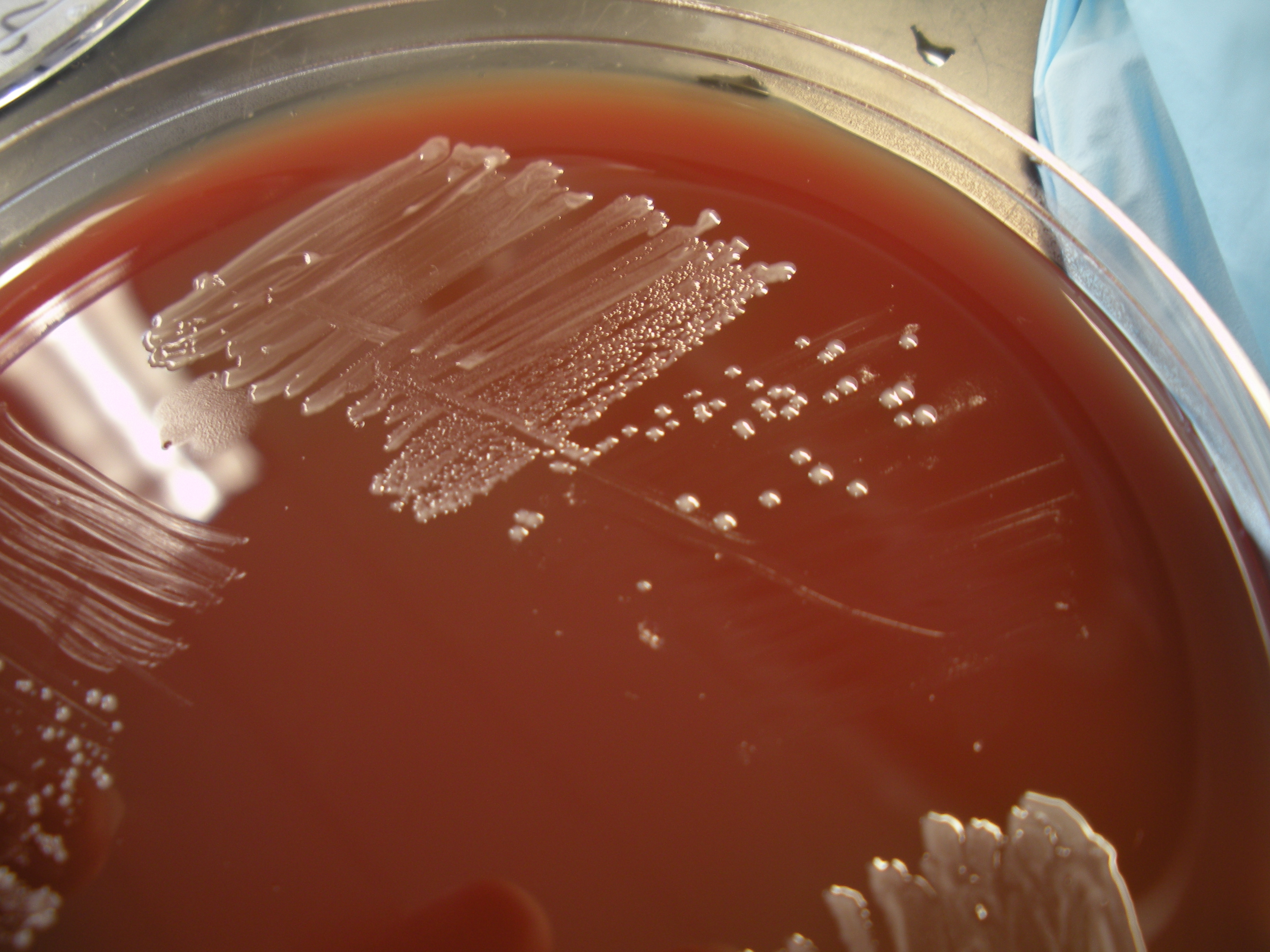
Colonies of Snodgrassella alvi on blood agar

The bacteria are immobile and form colonies with other bacteria in the bays of the intestinal wall of the bee gut. The strains can grow on blood agar, trypticase soy agar (TSA), heart infusion agar (HIA), and lysogeny broth (LB), forming smooth, white, and round colonies about 1 millimeter or less in diameter after 2 days.

=== Growth and metabolism ===
The species is microaerophilic, i.e. grows best at low oxygen levels. A 5% CO_{2} atmosphere at a temperature of 37 °C provides optimal growth conditions, while the bacteria show very weak or no growth in air or without oxygen (anaerobic). In the TSA, the growth range is approximately pH 6.0 to 6.5. The catalase test and the test for nitrate reductases are positive, while the oxidase test (detection of the enzyme cytochrome c oxidase) is negative. Tests of the strains for β-glucosidase, β-galactosidase, indole production, proteolysis of gelatin, and glucose fermentation are negative. They are not hemolytic and show variable reactions to urease and arginine dihydrolase.

The bacterium can use citric and malic acid as its main carbon source.

=== Chemotaxonomic features ===
The combined content of cytosine and guanine (GC-content) in DNA is 41 to 43 mol%. The main isoprenoid quinone is ubiquinone-10. The main components of the fatty acids produced are palmitic acid (C 16:0), cis-vaccenic acid (C 18:1ω7 c/C 18:1ω6 c) and lauric acid (C 12:0), by which Snodgrassella alvi can be distinguished from closely related species.

=== Genome ===
The genome of Snodgrassella alvi has been completely sequenced. Out of 2,226 protein-coding genes, 519 genes are essential and 399 genes are involved in gut colonization of honeybees.

== Lifestyle and physiology ==
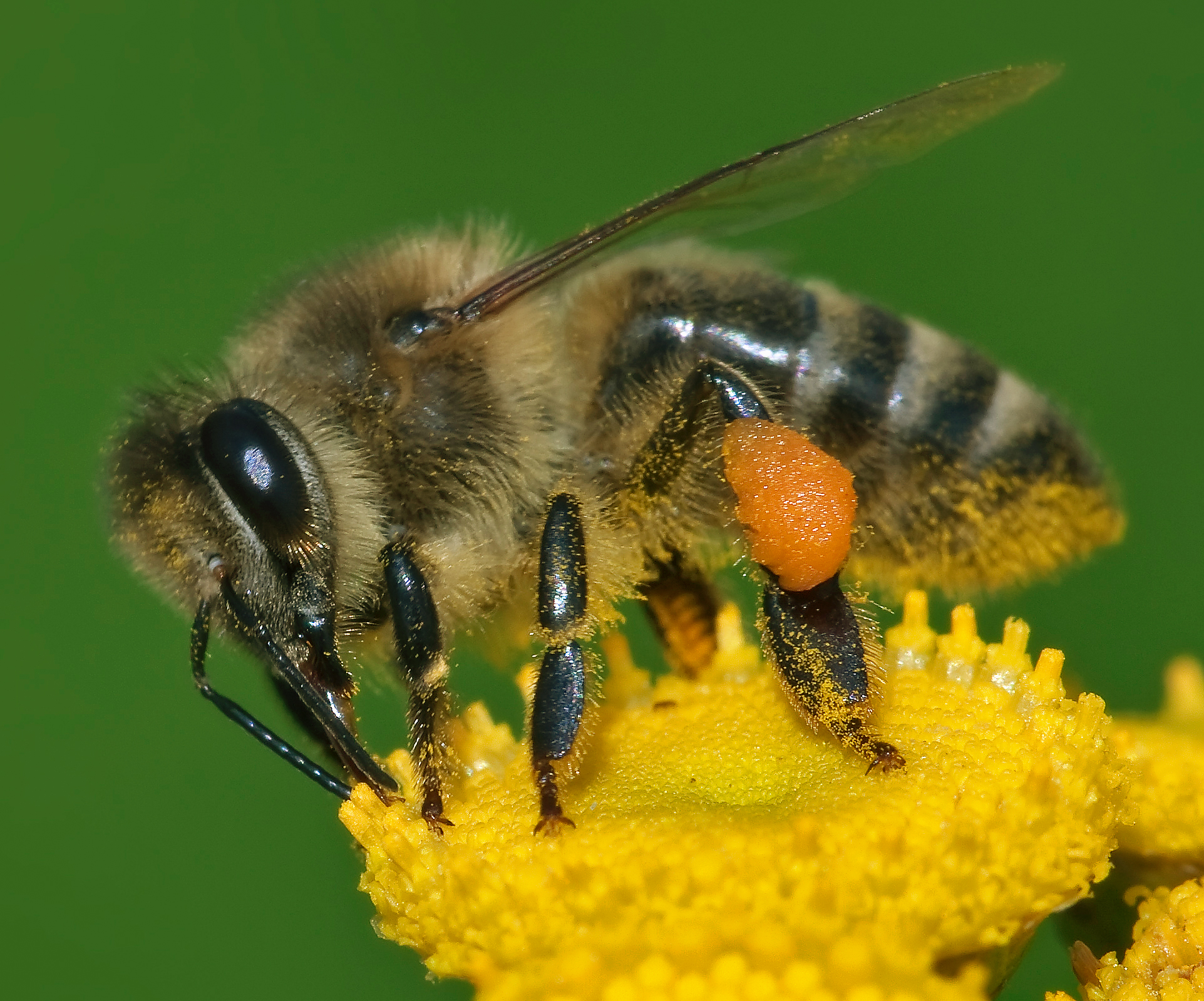
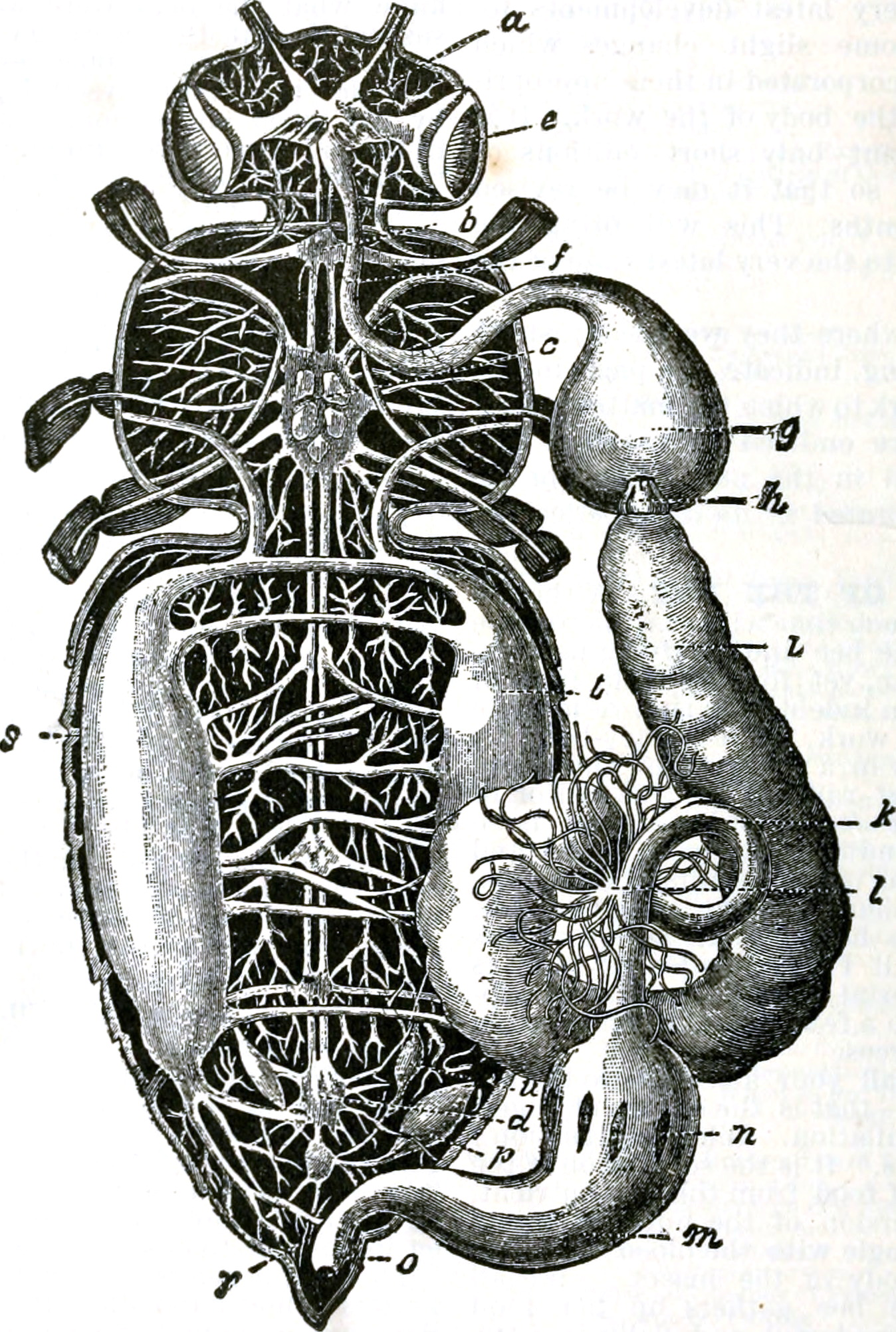
Snodgrassella alvi lives in the gut of honey bees. Together with Gilliamella apicola, it dominates the ileum area (k) behind the midgut (i) and the pylorus (l)

Snodgrassella alvi lives in the gut of honey bees and other corbiculate (pollen-basket) bees. Strains comparable in genome were found in all subsequently studied species of the genera Apis (n=6) and Bombus (n=8) and in 9 out of 13 studied species of stingless bees (Meliponini); it is not detected in other species and outside their hosts. It is a keystone species in the honeybee gut and dominates this microbiome together with seven other species, some of which have not yet been finally identified: Lactobacillus spp. Firm-4, Lactobacillus spp. Firm-5 (phylum Firmicutes), Bifidobacterium spp. (phylum Actinobacteria), Gilliamella apicola, Frischella perrara, Bartonella apis, and Alpha 2.1 (phylum Proteobacteria). Together, these species represent 95% of the intestinal bacteria. Snodgrassella alvi, Gilliamella apicola, and Frischella perrara are considered species-specific keystone species.

Snodgrassella alvi and the gammaproteobacterium Gilliamella apicola dominate the area of the ileum and colonize the inner wall of the intestine there. Only a few bacteria exist in the anterior region of the intestine, while Frischella perrara dominates the short region of the pylorus and is found almost exclusively there. In the rectum, Lactobacillus strains and Bifidobacterium are predominant.

The transmission of the microbiome and especially of key species occurs in social insects within the hive via the transmission of saliva and food. Bee larvae and young workers are almost devoid of gut bacteria in their first days of life and acquire their normal gut microbial flora orally only later through social interactions with other workers and by transmission between individuals within a hive during mutual food transfer (trophallaxis) in their first days outside the combs and at the beginning of their life in the colony. Although larvae are also fed by workers, their intestines, whose anterior and posterior parts are not connected before pupation, are almost free of bacteria. This is mainly attributed to a strong immune defense of the larvae and a bacteriocidal effect of the saliva of the feeding bees. Only after pupation and in the presence of nurse bees or the feces of these bees do the young workers develop the intestinal flora typical of the hive. In contrast, when exposed only to the hive material such as honeycomb, honey and bee bread or only to the saliva of bees and trophallaxis of other bees, they form atypical intestinal flora.

Within the intestine, the bacteria support the digestion of honey and pollen and probably also have a function in the immune defense against parasites and pathogenic bacteria. The protective effect of the natural bacterial composition has been demonstrated, among other things, against pathogens such as the protozoa Crithidia bombi or Nosema bombi, which infect various bumblebee species and lead to potentially fatal infections. However, excessive colonization of the bee gut by Snodgrassella alvi is likely to disrupt the gut flora and increase susceptibility to infection by the trypanosome Lotmaria passim.

=== Interaction with Gilliamella apicola ===
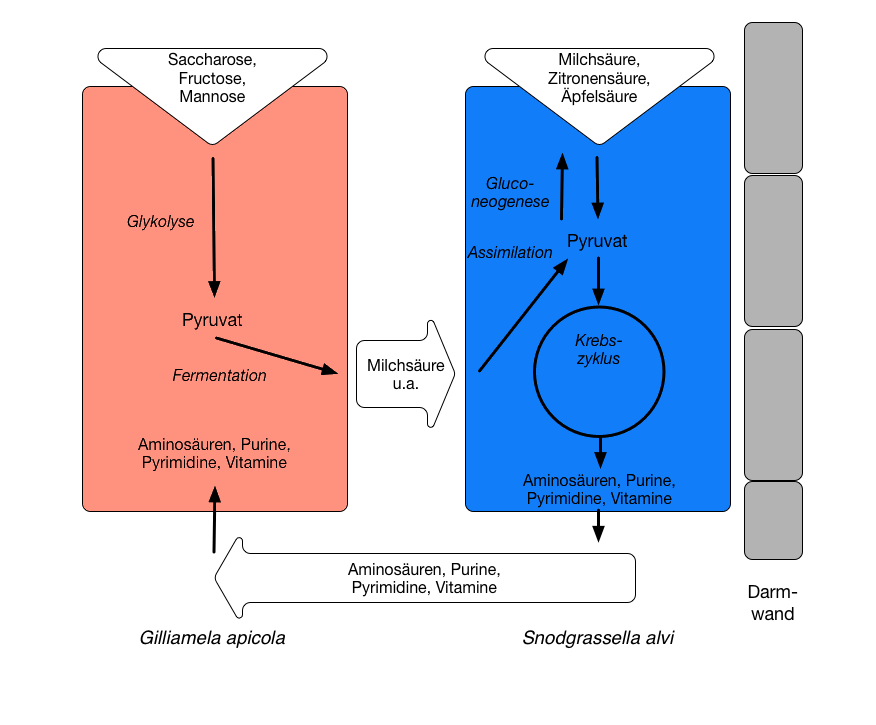
Interactions in metabolism between Gilliamella apicola and Snodgrassella alvi (simplified).

Within the bee gut, the two dominant species Gilliamella apicola and Snodgrassella alvi occupy different areas of the gut and different metabolic niches. Together, they form a biofilm on the inner gut wall, where the colonies of Snodgrassella alvi sit directly on the gut wall and the colonies of Gilliamella apicola cover them.

Gilliamella apicola is a bacterium that breaks down sugars and produces carboxylic acids (saccharolytic fermenter), while Snodgrassella alvi oxidizes carboxylic acids. In the gut, they form a metabolic resource-sharing network in which each species benefits from the properties of the other. Gilliamella apicola appropriately converts simple carbohydrates (sugars) into energy through glycolysis and passes the leftover molecules to Snodgrassella alvi, which has and uses the genes necessary for the Krebs cycle but cannot perform glycolysis. Both species also have numerous genes and proteins that enable intestinal colonization and interactions between bacterial cells.

Variations in these genes could explain the host fidelity of the strains observed in previous phylogenetic studies. Strains of Snodgrassella alvi can colonize their ancestral bee host but not bees of another genus. Consistent with specific, long-term host association, comparative genomic analysis revealed major differences and little or no gene flow between gut symbionts of bumblebees and bees. However, within a host type (Apis or Bombus), researchers detected evidence of horizontal gene transfer between Gilliamella apicola and Snodgrassella alvi, demonstrating the importance of the broader gut community in directing the evolution of individual members. The results indicated that host specificity is likely influenced by several factors, including direct interactions of bacteria with hosts, microbe-microbe interactions, and social transmission of gut flora.

=== Effect of antibiotics and glyphosate ===
The effects of various substances on the intestinal flora of bees have only been selectively researched. There are studies on the effect of antibiotics and glyphosate on the bacterial flora and especially on the colonization by Gilliamella apicola and Snodgrassella alvi.

In 2017, Kasie Raymann and colleagues studied the effect of the antibiotic tetracycline, which is used in hives in part to prevent bacterial infections of bee larvae, on the intestinal flora of bees. They found that the treatment led to a reduction in the number of cells of Snodgrassella alvi, while Gilliamella apicola was hardly reduced in number. However, in a second study, they found that there was a shift in genotypes in Gilliamella apicola in favor of antibiotic-resistant cells, resulting in a reduction in genetic diversity, while genetic diversity in Snodgrassella alvi was not affected. According to their studies, antibiotic exposure also resulted in reduced survival of bees, both in the hive and in laboratory experiments in which the bees were exposed to opportunistic bacterial pathogens.

It is generally assumed that the herbicide glyphosate is harmless to animals, including bees and other insects, because its action targets the enzyme 5-enolpyruvylshikimate-3-phosphate synthase (EPSPS), which is found only in plants and microorganisms. However, when making this assumption the effects of glyphosate on animal microbiomes had not been considered, including the microorganisms that colonize the bee gut,. The gene encoding EPSPS is present in almost all sequenced genomes of bee gut bacteria, suggesting that they are potentially susceptible to glyphosate. According to a study published in September 2018, glyphosate affects the gut microbiota of young honey bees by inhibiting the shikimate pathway, particularly in Snodgrassella alvi. Exposure of bees to glyphosate thus alters, at least experimentally, the gut microbiota of young honeybee workers, thereby also increasing the bees' susceptibility to infection. As a result, a weakening of resistance to opportunistic pathogens and especially the harmful bacterial species Serratia marcescens has been observed, which is associated with increased mortality in the bees. This effect has been discussed in the press as a possible cause of the colony collapse disorder observed internationally. However, resistance of some strains of Snodgrassella alvi to glyphosate has also been described.

=== Use for mite repellent and infection control ===
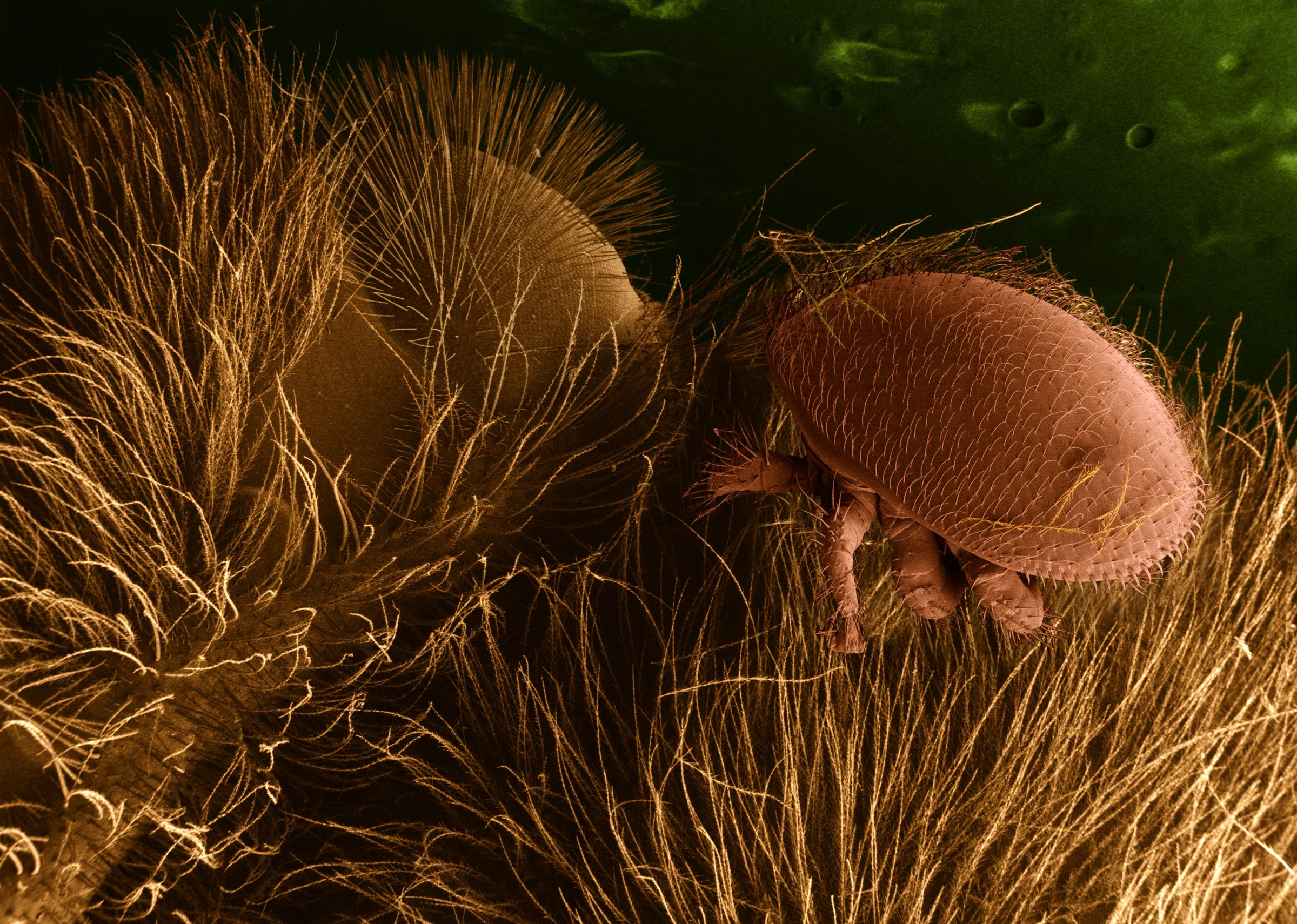
Varroa mite on a bee in a scanning electron microscope

In January 2020, the results of a research project were published in which genetically modified Snodgrassella alvi were used to strengthen the bees' immune defenses against infestation by the varroa mite (Varroa destructor) and virus infections induced by it. The team modified the bacteria to produce labeled double-stranded RNA (dsRNA) through an incorporated plasmid. The dsRNA module can be targeted to interfere with specific bee genes as well as key virus and mite genes. In the laboratory, gene expression of the selected region could be blocked for at least 15 days when the modified bacteria established in the bee gut and continuously expressed the dsRNA. As an effect, the survival of varroa mites on the bees was reduced as well as the transmission and infection with deformed wing virus was inhibited.

== Taxonomy ==
=== External systematics ===
Snodgrassella alvi was isolated from the gut of the European honey bee by Waldan K. Kwong and Nancy A. Moran together with Gilliamella apicola and described scientifically in 2012. Even before that, both species were identified by Vincent G. Martinson and colleagues also in the research group of Nancy A. Moran, and provisionally named Candidatus Snodgrassella alvi and Gilliamella apicola. The genus Snodgrassella was named after the American entomologist Robert Evans Snodgrass, honoring him as a pioneer in the study of insect physiology in the early 20th century, while the species epithet "alvi" refers to the lacunae of the bee intestine. The type strain is wkB2 T (= NCIMB 14803 T = ATCC BAA-2449 T = NRRL B-59751 T), isolated from the gut of the western honeybee (A. mellifera) in Connecticut.

- - Leeia oryzae
  - - Amantichitinum, Chitiniphilus, Andreprevotia, Deefgia, Chitinibacter, Chitinilyticum
    - - Aquaspirillium, Microvirgula, Laribacter
      - - Gulbenkiania, Pseudogulbenkiania, Vogesella, Chromobacterium
        - - Vitreoscilla
          - - - Snodgrassella alvi
              - Stenoxybacter acetivorans
            - Neisseria, Eikenella, Conchiformibius, Alysiella, Simonsiella, Klingella, Bergeriella

Phylogenetic position of Snodgrassella alvi according to Kwong 2017.

The bacteria are classified as Betaproteobacteria within the Neisseriaceae and are related to similar bacteria found in the gut of termites or other insects. Kwong created a cladogram of the Neisseriaceae in 2017 based on published genomic data, in which he placed Snodgrassella alvi as a sister species to Stenoxybacter acetivorans, a species found in the intestines of termites, and placed it at the base of a taxon consisting of the genera Neisseria (polyphyletic), Eikenella, Conchiformibius, Alysiella, Simonsiella, Klingella, and Bergeriella, along with the genus Vitreoscilla. While the more basal taxa are found primarily in open habitats such as soil or aquatic environments, the derived forms including Stenoxybacter and Snodgrassella are generally attached to other organisms, primarily animals.

A research group led by Chinese researcher Yong Li grouped Vitreoscilla, Stenoxybacter, and Snodgrassella into a taxon that additionally includes the species Populibacter corticis, newly described in the paper, from the bark of a Canadian poplar (Populus × euramericana) canker as a sister species of Snodgrassella alvi.

=== Strains and host specificity ===
Within the species, bacteria are classified according to strains taken from different hosts. Accordingly, the strain wkB2 T used for the initial description was isolated from the gut of the Western honeybee (Apis mellifera) in Connecticut. As a specialized gut symbiont, Snodgrassella alvi evolved for millions of years with honeybees and bumblebees (genus Bombus), where the bacteria are found.

Investigations revealed that the different strains of Snodgrassella alvi from honey bees worldwide hardly differ in the gene sequences of the 16S rRNA (in the V4 region) and are almost identical. In contrast, there are differences in the single-copy gene minD (an ATPase that inhibits cell division) mainly in strains of Snodgrassella alvi from honeybees, while bumblebees have only one strain of Snodgrassella alvi. When comparing Snodgrassella alvi strains from honey bees with those from different bumblebee species, it was found that genetic variability within individual honey bees of a hive is significantly higher than among bumblebees of a colony, the diversity being attributed to the establishment of a bee colony by swarms of workers as opposed to a single bumblebee. As a result, the gut of individual honeybees is usually colonized (86%) by multiple strains of Snodgrassella alvi, whereas that of bumblebees usually contains only one strain (72%). In addition, host specificity of honey bee bacteria was found, with no strains found in both honey bee and bumblebee species. Within bumblebees, there are some Snodgrassella alvi strains that are species- or subgenus-specific, while others are found in multiple species of different subgenera. Further analysis revealed that there are significantly greater differences in the protein-coding genes of honeybee strains of Snodgrassella alvi, in contrast to those of rRNA. This is explained by the fact that the variability of the 16S rRNA loci had been restricted by frequent recombination within populations, while other regions of the genome continuously evolve and diversify in adaptation to changing ecological conditions in the gut.

== Bibliography ==
- Kwong, Waldan K.; Moran, Nancy A. (2012). "Cultivation and characterization of the gut symbionts of honey bees and bumble bees: description of Snodgrassella alvi gen. nov., sp. nov., a member of the family Neisseriaceae of the Betaproteobacteria, and Gilliamella apicola gen. nov., sp. nov., a member of Orbaceae fam. nov., Orbales ord. nov., a sister taxon to the order 'Enterobacteriales' of the Gammaproteobacteria". International Journal of Systematic and Evolutionary Microbiology. 63 (Pt 6): 2008–2018. doi:10.1099/IJS.0.044875-0. PMID 23041637.
