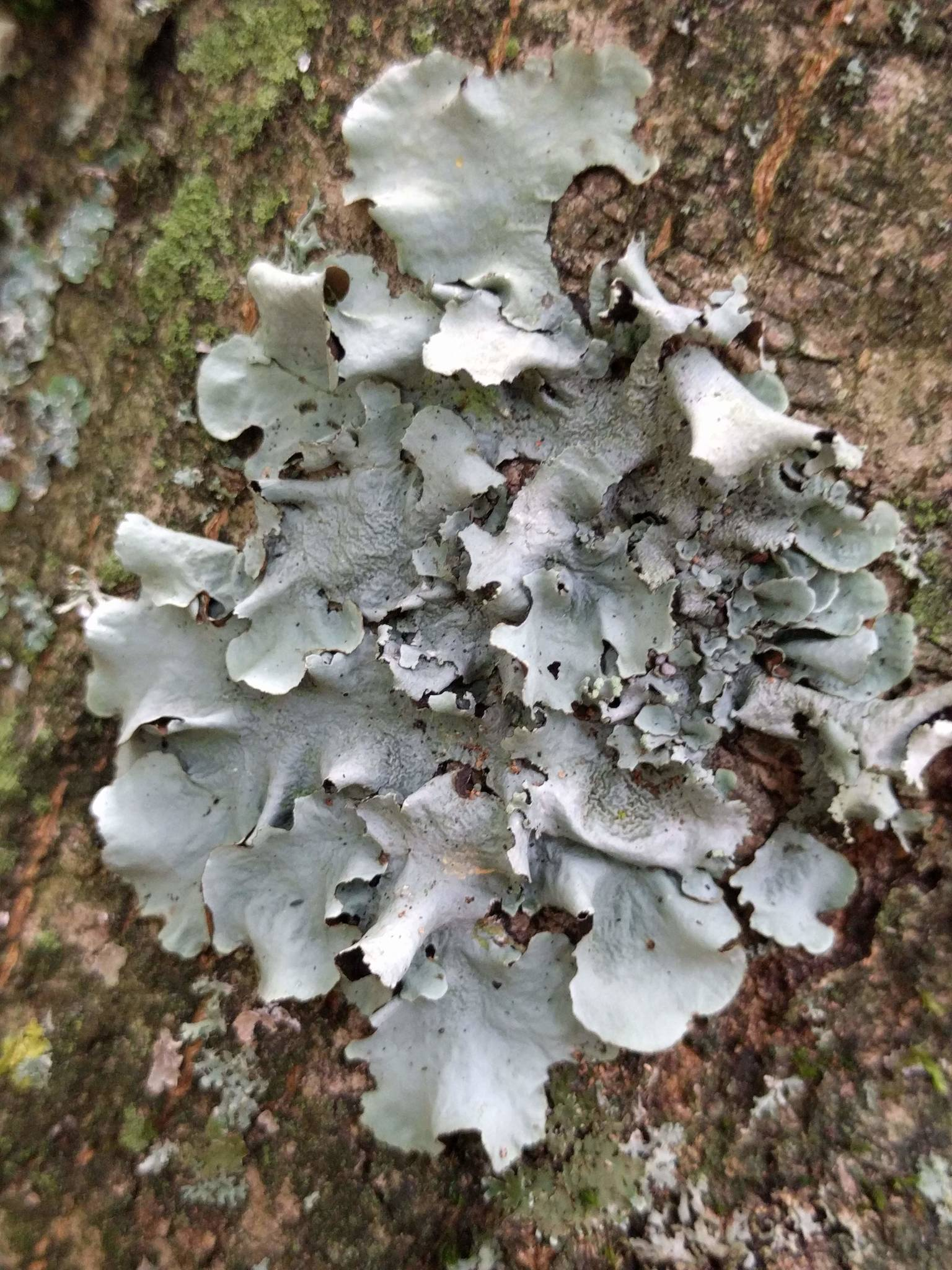
- in Noordwijk, Netherlands

Conservation status
- Apparently Secure (NatureServe)

Scientific classification
- Kingdom: Fungi
- Division: Ascomycota
- Class: Lecanoromycetes
- Order: Lecanorales
- Family: Parmeliaceae
- Genus: Parmotrema
- Species: P. perlatum

Binomial name
- Parmotrema perlatum (Huds.) M.Choisy (1952)

Synonyms
- List: Lichen perlatus Huds. (1762); Lobaria perlata (Huds.) Hoffm. (1796); Parmelia perlata (Huds.) Ach. (1803); Platysma perlatum (Huds.) Frege (1812); Platisma perlatum (Huds.) Frege (1812); Imbricaria perlata (Huds.) Körb. (1846); Lobaria perlata var. ciliata DC. (1805); Parmelia perlata var. ciliata (DC.) Duby (1830); Imbricaria perlata var. ciliata (DC.) Körb. (1846); Parmelia ciliata (DC.) Nyl. (1878); Parmelia crinita var. ciliata (DC.) Stizenb. (1882); Imbricaria ciliata (DC.) Arnold (1884); Parmelia perlata subsp. ciliata (DC.) Cromb. (1894); Parmelia perlata subvar. ciliata (DC.) Harm. (1897); Parmelia perlata f. ciliata (DC.) Boistel (1903); Parmelia urceolata f. ciliata (DC.) Jatta (1909); Parmelia trichotera f. ciliata (DC.) B.de Lesd. (1910); Parmotrema perlatum var. ciliatum (DC.) M.Choisy (1952); Parmelia coniocarpa Laurer (1827); Parmelia perlata var. innocua Wallr. (1831); Imbricaria perlata var. innocua Körb. (1855); Parmelia trichotera Hue (1898); Parmelia perlata subsp. trichotera (Hue) Boistel (1903); Parmelia perlata var. trichotera (Hue) Maheu (1907); Parmotrema trichoterum (Hue) M.Choisy (1952)

= Parmotrema perlatum =

Species of lichen

Parmotrema perlatum, commonly known as the powdered ruffle lichen, is a common species of foliose lichen in the family Parmeliaceae. The species has a cosmopolitan distribution and occurs throughout the Northern and Southern Hemispheres. Parmotrema perlatum is a prominent and widely recognised species within its genus across primarily temperate zones, preferring humid, oceanic-suboceanic habitats. It is found in diverse geographic areas including Africa, North and South America, Asia, Australasia, Europe, and islands in the Atlantic and Pacific oceans. It usually grows on bark, but occasionally occurs on siliceous rocks, often among mosses.

The thallus of Parmotrema perlatum is large, light-grey to pale-blue patch-shaped with rounded and ruffled lobes and often with black hair-cilia at the edges. Distinguishing features of the lichen include its conspicuous soralia (reproductive structures) near the lobe edges, curled leaf-like lobes, and a narrow, shiny, and sometimes wrinkly area on the underside near the margin. This species is known for producing certain secondary metabolites, namely atranorin and a group of substances known as the stictic acid complex, which includes stictic and constictic acids, among other related compounds. These morphological and chemical characteristics help distinguish P. perlatum from several other potential lookalikes.

Parmotrema perlatum has a complex taxonomic history, having undergone multiple reclassifications since its original description in 1762. Significant efforts in the mid-20th century helped clarify its nomenclature, stabilising its current name. Although there were challenges to this name in the 1980s, it was confirmed as valid in 2004. More recently, DNA studies suggest that there may be hidden diversity within the species, indicating the need for further taxonomic evaluation.

The lichen is used as a spice in Indian cuisine. For this purpose, it is commonly known as black stone flower or kalpasi (among other names). Although nearly tasteless on its own, it releases an earthy fragrance and taste when cooked in oil or butter.

== Systematics ==
=== Historical taxonomy ===
The taxonomy of Parmotrema perlatum has a rich history marked by periods of confusion and clarification that typify the dynamic nature of botanical classification. It was originally described as Lichen perlatus by William Hudson in his 1762 work Flora Anglica. Hudson described it as a foliaceous (leafy) lichen with creeping, lobed, and smooth characteristics, having a pearly edge, a farinaceous (pruinose) texture, and a black underside, adorned with slightly scalloped, brown, stalked fruiting bodies. The taxon was later transferred to the genus Parmelia by Erik Acharius in 1803, becoming Parmelia perlata. The name was well-established in scientific literature, being cited extensively in works like Alexander Zahlbruckner's popular 1929 catalogue.

In 1952, Maurice Choisy reclassified it under the current name, Parmotrema perlatum. The nomenclature of Parmotrema perlatum was revisited in the late 20th century, amid a broader effort to clarify the typification and application of early lichen names. Mason Hale, in 1961, undertook a detailed restudy of the species, selecting a lectotype from the Dillenian collections—the herbarium and associated works of Johann Jacob Dillenius housed at the University of Oxford. This solidified the application of Hudson's name and was part of a larger trend in lichenology to fix historical names to specific herbarium specimens to stabilise nomenclature.

The name Parmelia perlata was widely accepted until Hale and Ahti (1986) encountered the designation Lichen chinensis, introduced by Pehr Osbeck in 1757. They proposed the name Parmotrema chinense, based on the assumption that Osbeck's specimen corresponded to the well-known species Parmotrema perlatum. However, this proposal was not universally adopted due to the lack of valid typification and the name's absence in the literature between 1757 and 1986.

==== Impact of the Tokyo Code (1993) ====
The Tokyo Code of 1993 extended the provisions for conserving names to all species, not just those of major economic importance. This change in the International Code of Botanical Nomenclature allowed for the conservation of names that would promote nomenclatural stability. Despite this provision, no formal proposal was made to conserve the name Parmotrema chinense, and thus it did not gain widespread acceptance.

David Hawksworth's 2004 study brought significant clarity to the taxonomic confusion. He rediscovered Osbeck's original material in Linnaeus' herbarium and identified it as belonging to Parmotrema tinctorum, not Parmotrema perlatum. Hawksworth demonstrated that Lichen chinensis was not validly published because it lacked a proper description and was linked with an expression of doubt by Osbeck. Hawksworth's work led to the reinstatement of the name Parmotrema perlatum, confirming that Hudson's name was legitimate and should continue to be used. This resolution was based on the original typification by Hale and the invalid publication status of Lichen chinensis.

Recent studies suggest that the circumscription of Parmotrema perlatum may need to be revised. Research utilising DNA sequencing has uncovered cryptic diversity within the genus Parmotrema, indicating that traditional phenotype-based identification methods may underestimate species diversity. Specifically, the genetic analysis of P. perlatum and related species revealed multiple distinct lineages that were previously grouped under a single nominal taxon. These findings highlight the need for a comprehensive taxonomic re-evaluation of P. perlatum to accurately delineate species boundaries and account for hidden genetic diversity.

=== Phylogeny ===
In molecular phylogenetics analysis, Parmotrema perlatum has a sister relationship with Parmotrema crinitum. These two species form a clade that itself is sister to a clade with P. austrosinense and P. tinctorum. In a comprehensive phylogenetic analysis by Stelate and colleagues (2022), P. perlatum and P crinitum were found to form a well-supported monophyletic group using internal transcribed spacer sequences and several analytical methods. This study highlights the complexity of species boundaries within the genus and the need for further research incorporating additional molecular markers to confirm these findings.

=== Common names ===
Vernacular names used for this species include black stone flower, stone lichen, sea lichen, kalpasi, kalpas, kalpashi, and kalpash. The latter name and its variations, however, have been used as a crude drug in Indian medicines for more than one species, including Parmotrema perlatum, Parmotrema tinctorum, and Everniastrum cirrhatum. In North America, vernacular names used for the species include "powdered ruffle lichen", "powdered scatter-rug", and "queen ruffle". The species epithet perlatum refers to the pearl-like margins of the lobes, which are directly referenced in Hudson's original 1762 description of the species. He proposed the English name "pearl lichen"; this name later morphed into "pearly parmelia" in some 19th-century British accounts of lichen flora.

== Description ==
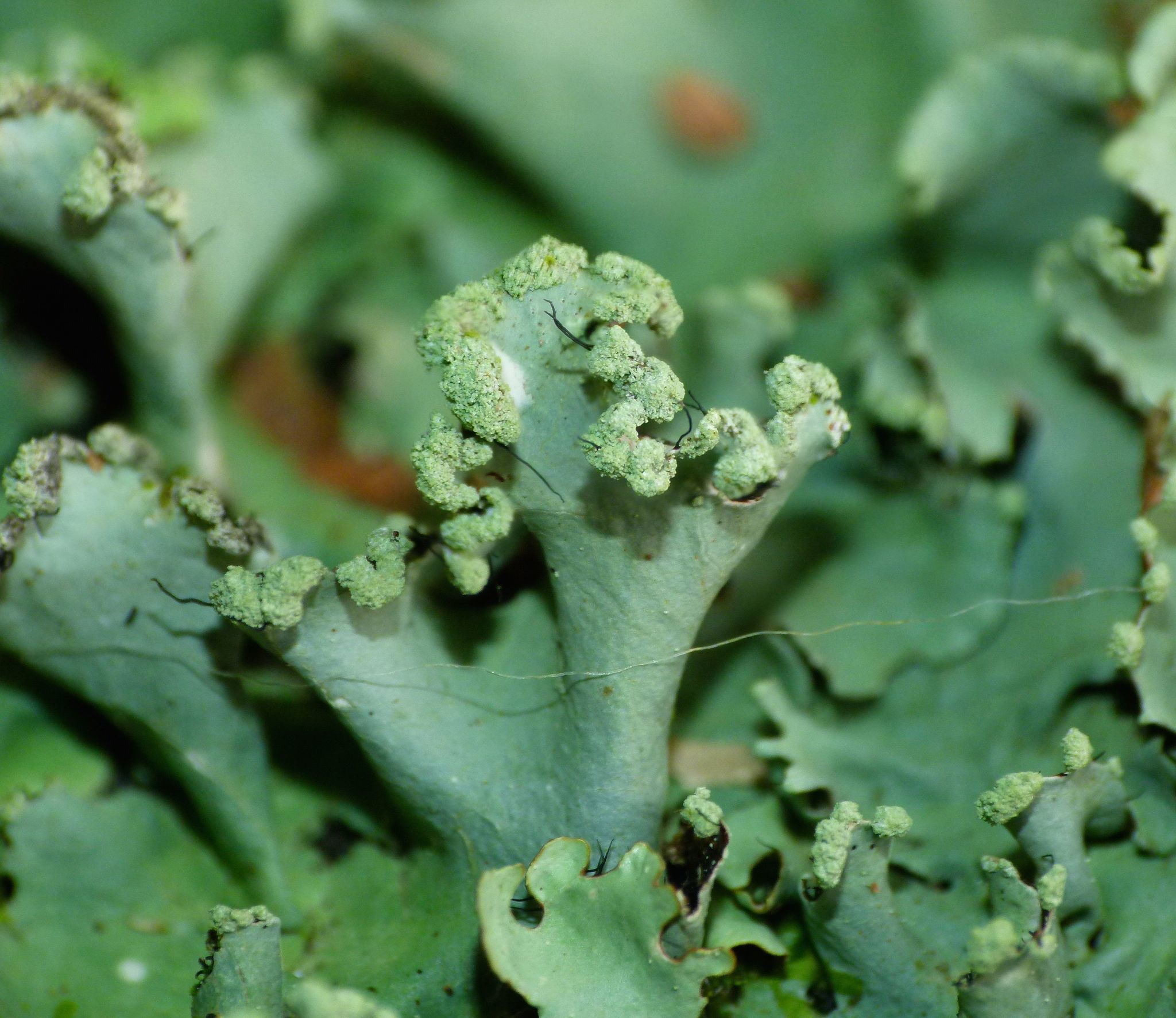
Closeup of soredious lobe edges ...

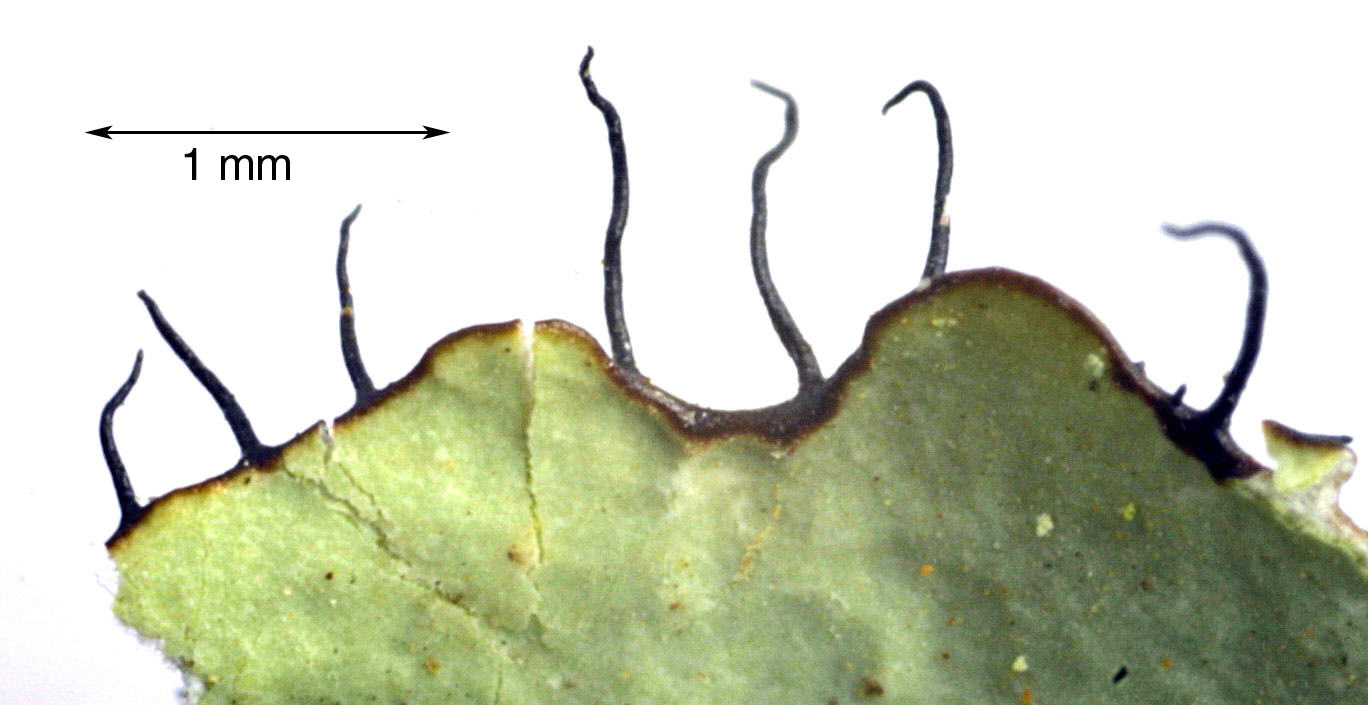
... and marginal cilia.

Parmotrema perlatum has a thallus that ranges from loosely to tightly attached to the surface it grows on, forming expansive, spreading colonies that often merge together. Individual thalli typically measure up to 10–15 cm (4–6 in) in diameter. The upper thallus surface is greenish-grey, blue-grey, or yellowish-grey in colour, lacking pruina and either free of spots (maculae), or with few maculae. This species develops soredia, a type of asexual reproductive structure, aiding in its propagation. The lobes of this lichen vary from 1.5 to 10 mm in width, with a wave-like (undulate) or ruffled pattern and overlapping (imbricate) arrangement. The tips and edges of these lobes are generally smooth and round, sometimes notched (crenate) or incised, often curling up or inward, revealing the paler brown to black underside adorned with hair-like structures (cilia) up to 2.5 mm in length. Rhizines are common on the underside of the thallus, except for a brown border near the edges.

The soredia found in this species are granular and appear white or may become grey due to wear. They are located within specifically structured groups called soralia, which can be linear to oval in shape, often positioned at the edges of the lobes. The presence of soredia causes the lobe margins to curl back and form capitate soralia. The upper surface of the lichen is typically whitish grey to pale greenish-grey, and can be either smooth or slightly wrinkled, without spots (immaculate), featuring scattered, shallow cracks. Isidia are absent in this species.

Apothecia (fruiting bodies) are rare in Parmotrema perlatum. When present, they measure 4–8 mm across and are somewhat stalked and funnel-shaped with a brown, concave disc. The edges of these structures curl inward, becoming thick with soredia as they mature. Its spores are ellipsoid in shape and typically measure between 20 and 28 μm in length and 11 to 17 μm in width, with a wall thickness of 2–3 μm. Pycnidia, which are structures that produce asexual spores called conidia, appear sporadically on the surface (laminal) of the thallus, with the conidia being thread-like and straight, measuring 6–8 by 1 μm.

=== Photobiont ===
The photobiont partner of Parmotrema perlatum is from Trebouxia, a green algal genus belonging to the order Trebouxiales (order Chlorophyta). It has been identified as an undescribed species within a clade containing Trebouxia arboricola.

A study compared the desiccation tolerance and physiological responses of lichenised Trebouxia to isolated cultures of the same alga. Both forms can survive extended desiccation, but with differing responses to photo-oxidative stress. Lichenisation enhances the photoprotective mechanisms of Trebouxia, improving quenching of excess light energy, particularly under high relative humidity, and controlling reactive oxygen species production under light exposure. However, isolated cultures showed better photosynthetic performance after desiccation recovery. This research demonstrates the mutual benefits of the lichen-photobiont partnership, where the alga gains a sheltered environment boosting its resilience to environmental stressors.

Further studies on Parmotrema perlatum revealed specific antioxidant mechanisms supporting its photobiont under stress. The lichen shows high levels of reactive oxygen species scavenging enzymes such as superoxide dismutase and ascorbate peroxidase, protecting the photobiont from oxidative damage during dehydration and rehydration cycles. This enhanced antioxidant system provides not only physical shelter but also biochemical protection, increasing the photobiont's resilience to environmental fluctuations.

== Chemistry ==
Chemically, Parmotrema perlatum contains atranorin and chloroatranorin, alongside a predominant stictic acid chemosyndrome that includes stictic as a major secondary metabolite and smaller amounts of constictic acid and other related substances. Testing the medulla (the inner layer beneath the upper cortex) with spot tests results in K+ (yellow), KC−, and P+ (orange) reactions. The cortical layer, in contrast, is K+ (yellow), KC−, and P−.

The secondary metabolites of Parmotrema perlatum have been studied using gas chromatography–mass spectrometry (GC–MS) and liquid chromatography–mass spectrometry (LC–MS/MS). The lichen produces several notable compounds, including orcinol, atraric acid, benzoic acid, 2,4-dihydroxy-3,6-dimethyl-, methyl ester, and palmitic acid, methyl ester. GC–MS analysis revealed the presence of orcinol (63%) and atraric acid (21%) in the methanol extract, while benzoic acid was predominant in the chloroform extract. The hexane extract contained significant amounts of benzoic acid, 2,4-dihydroxy-3,6-dimethyl-, methyl ester (62%). A more recent study using liquid chromatography-electrospray ionization-mass spectrometry/mass spectrometry as an analysis technique tentatively identified a total of twenty-five lichen products, including 5 depsides, 12 depsidones, 2 diphenyl ethers, 1 aromatic considered as possible artifact, 1 dibenzofuran, 1 carbohydrate, 1 organic acid, and 2 undefined compounds.

== Similar species ==
The distinguishing features of Parmotrema perlatum, such as the presence of soredia and stictic acid, facilitate its easy identification. In mature specimens, the appearance of scattered, fine cracks on the upper surface may resemble the cracked maculae seen in P. reticulatum, which shares similar habitats. However, the two species can be differentiated chemically, as P. reticulatum contains salazinic acid, unlike P. perlatum.

Parmotrema perlatum and Parmotrema stuppeum are two morphologically similar species that can be found in similar habitats. Both species have a loosely attached thallus with revolute, wavy lobes and sparsely ciliate lobe tips. Their upper cortex is continuous and not finely reticulately cracked, while the lower surface is black and rhizinate. Both species also feature linear soralia. However, there are several key differences that can help distinguish between the two. While earlier descriptions suggested that P. stuppeum has a matte, olive-green to brownish-green upper surface and P. perlatum has a slightly shiny, whitish-grey to greyish-green upper surface, recent observations have shown that both species have a distinctly matte upper surface with similar colouration.

The most reliable morphological difference in the field is the location of the soralia: P. stuppeum has strictly terminal soralia, whereas P. perlatum has submarginal soralia. Additionally, the two species can be distinguished by their chemical composition. P. stuppeum contains salazinic acid, while P. perlatum has a stictic acid complex. Although both acids cause a Pd+ orange to orange-red medulla reaction, a potassium (K) spot test can separate the species: the medulla of P. perlatum turns yellow (K+ yellow), whereas in P. stuppeum, the yellow colour turns red (K+ yellow turning red).

Parmotrema perlatum can be distinguished from other sorediate and marginally ciliate species like P. arnoldii and P. robustum by the presence of the stictic acid chemosyndrome. Also, the medulla of P. arnoldii fluoresces strongly when lit with an ultraviolet lamp. Parmotrema perlatum is similar to P. crinitum due to both species having a brown to tan, erhizinate marginal zone and the presence of the stictic acid chemosyndrome in the medulla. However, P. crinitum can be distinguished by its isidiate upper surface. Another potential lookalike, P. margaritatum, is distinguished from P. perlatum by the K+ (red) reaction of its medulla. Cetrelia cetrarioides has been documented as a lookalike, presumably because of the cilia on its thallus margin, and the presence of atranorin and the stictic acid chemosyndrome.

Lookalikes
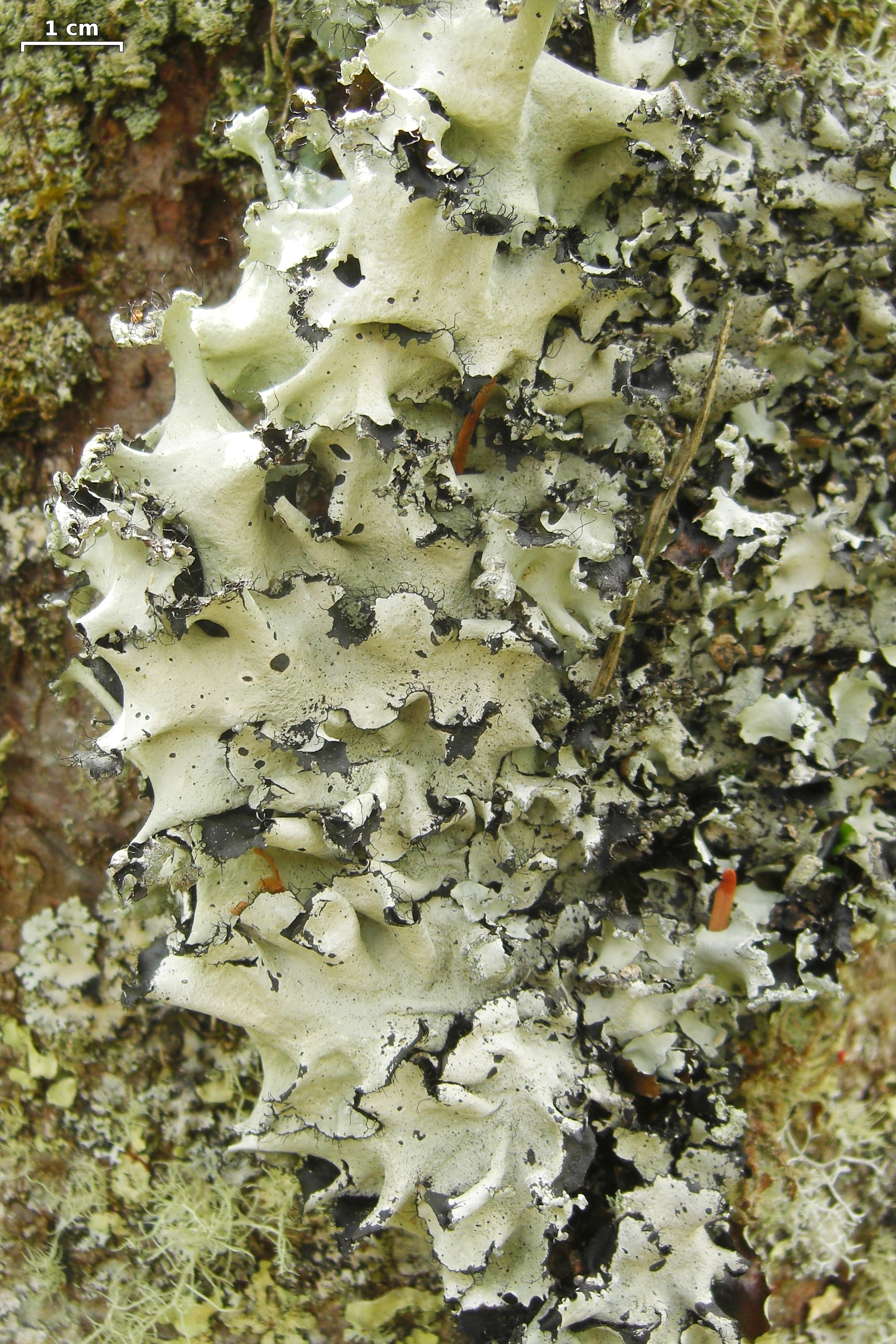
Parmotrema arnoldii

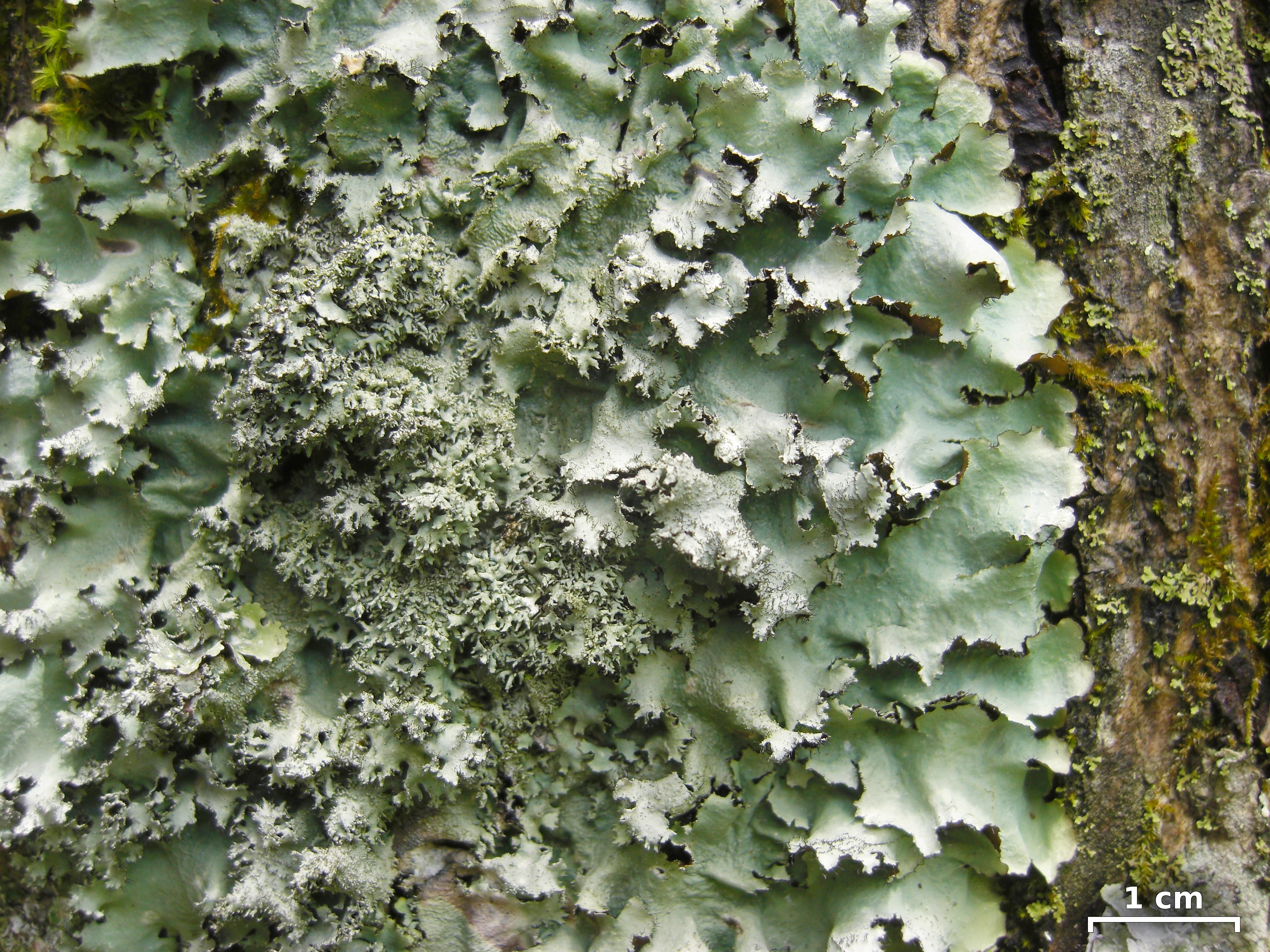
Parmotrema crinitum

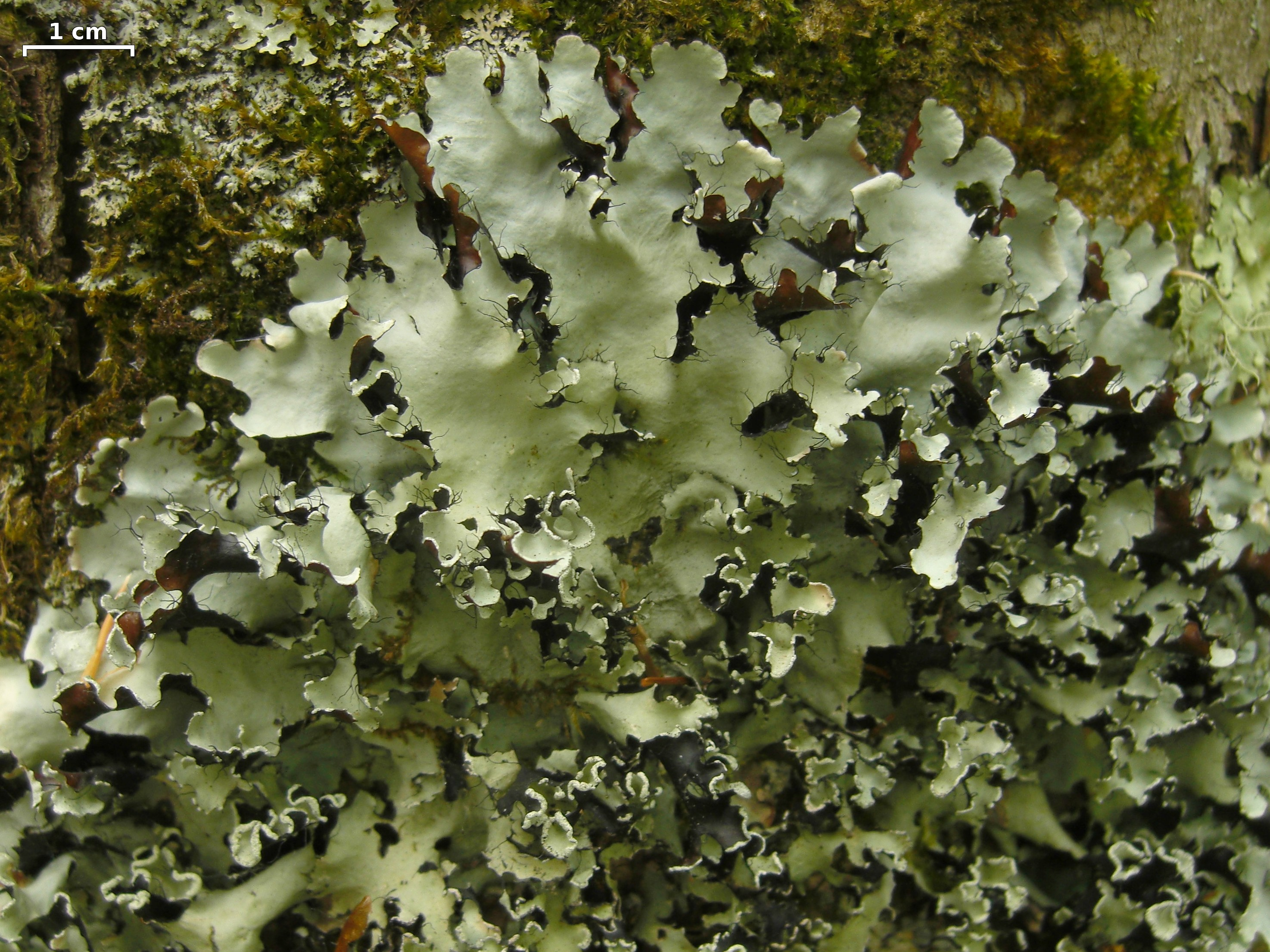
Parmotrema stuppeum

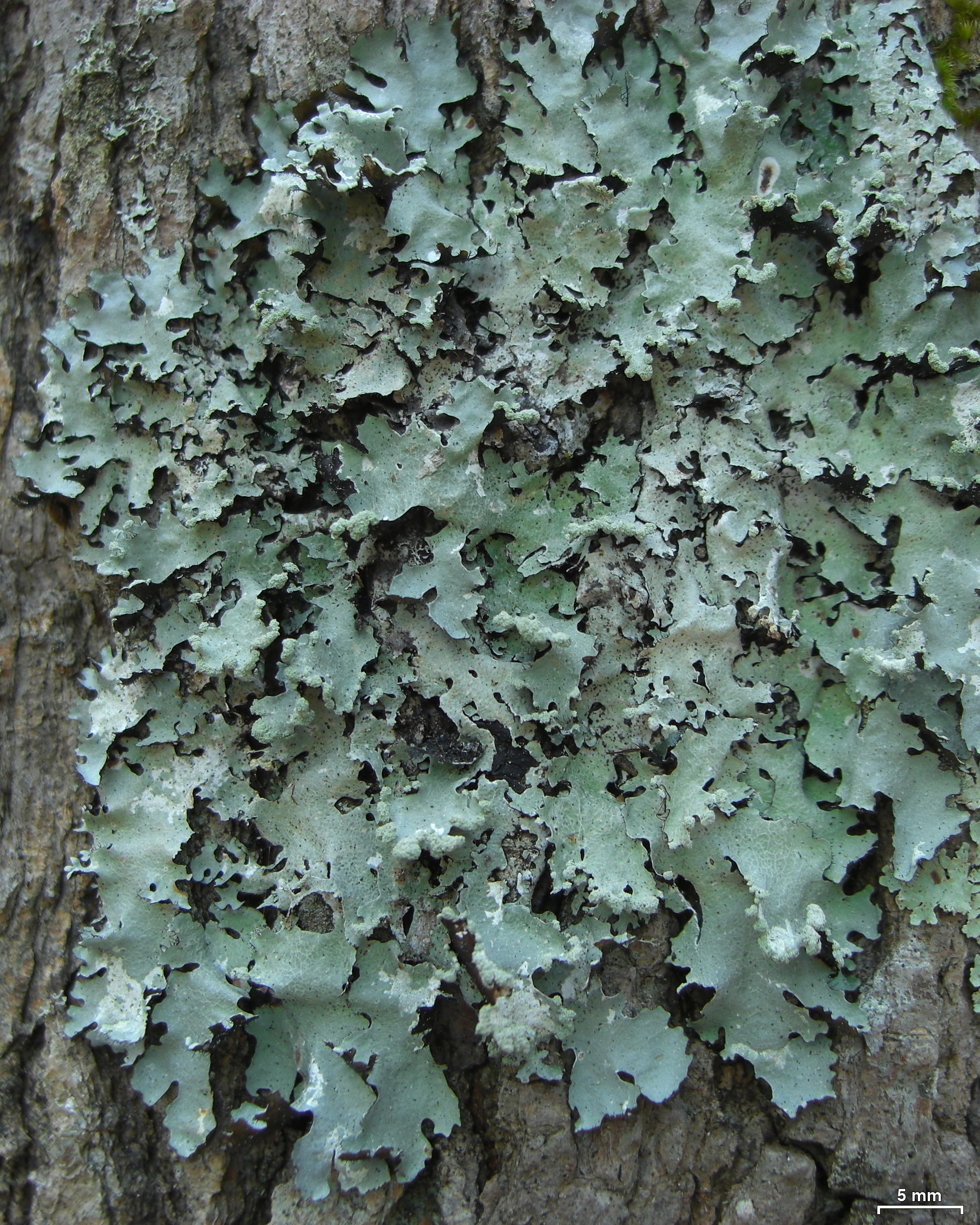
Parmotrema reticulatum

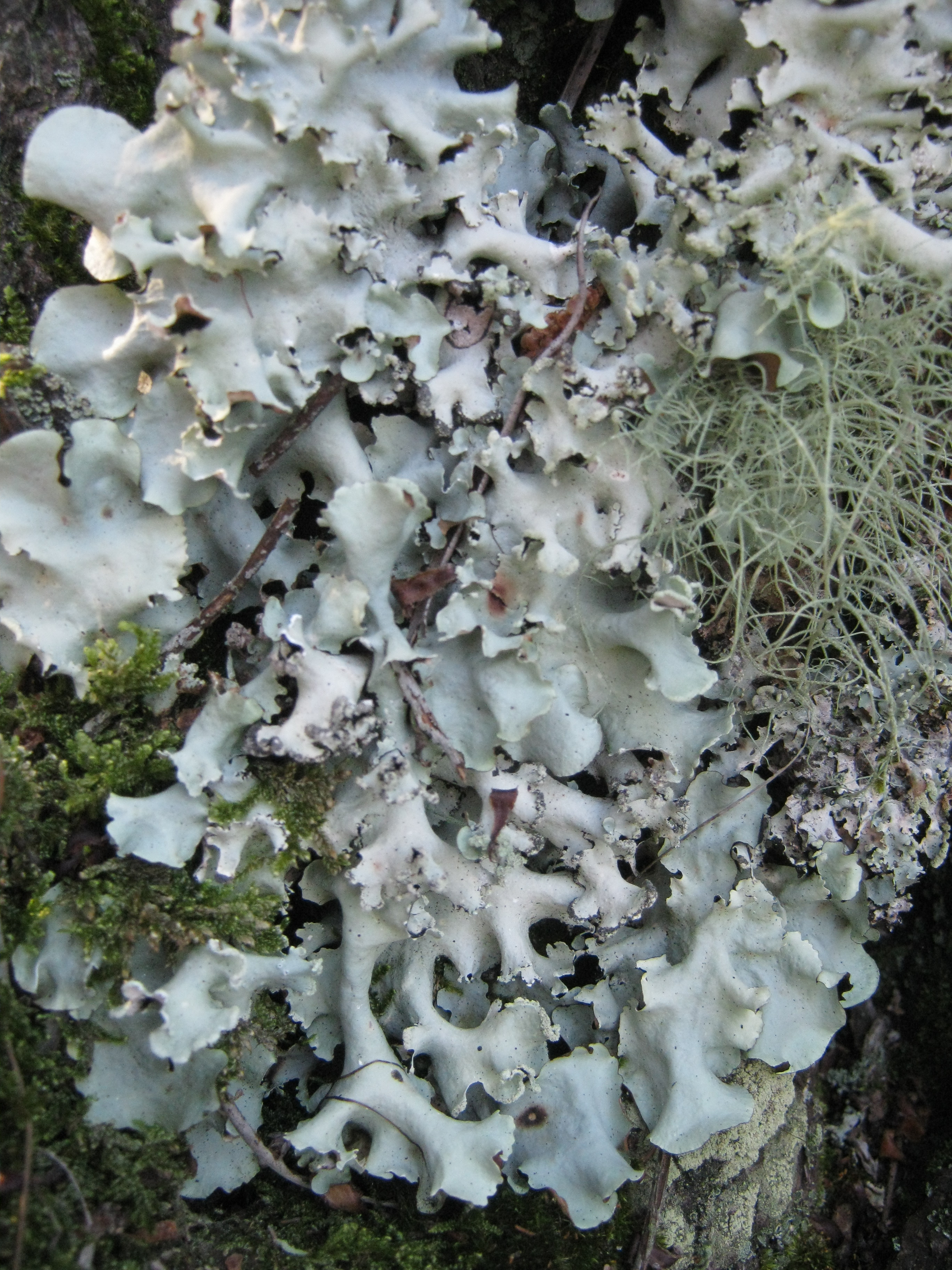
Parmotrema robustum

== Habitat and distribution ==
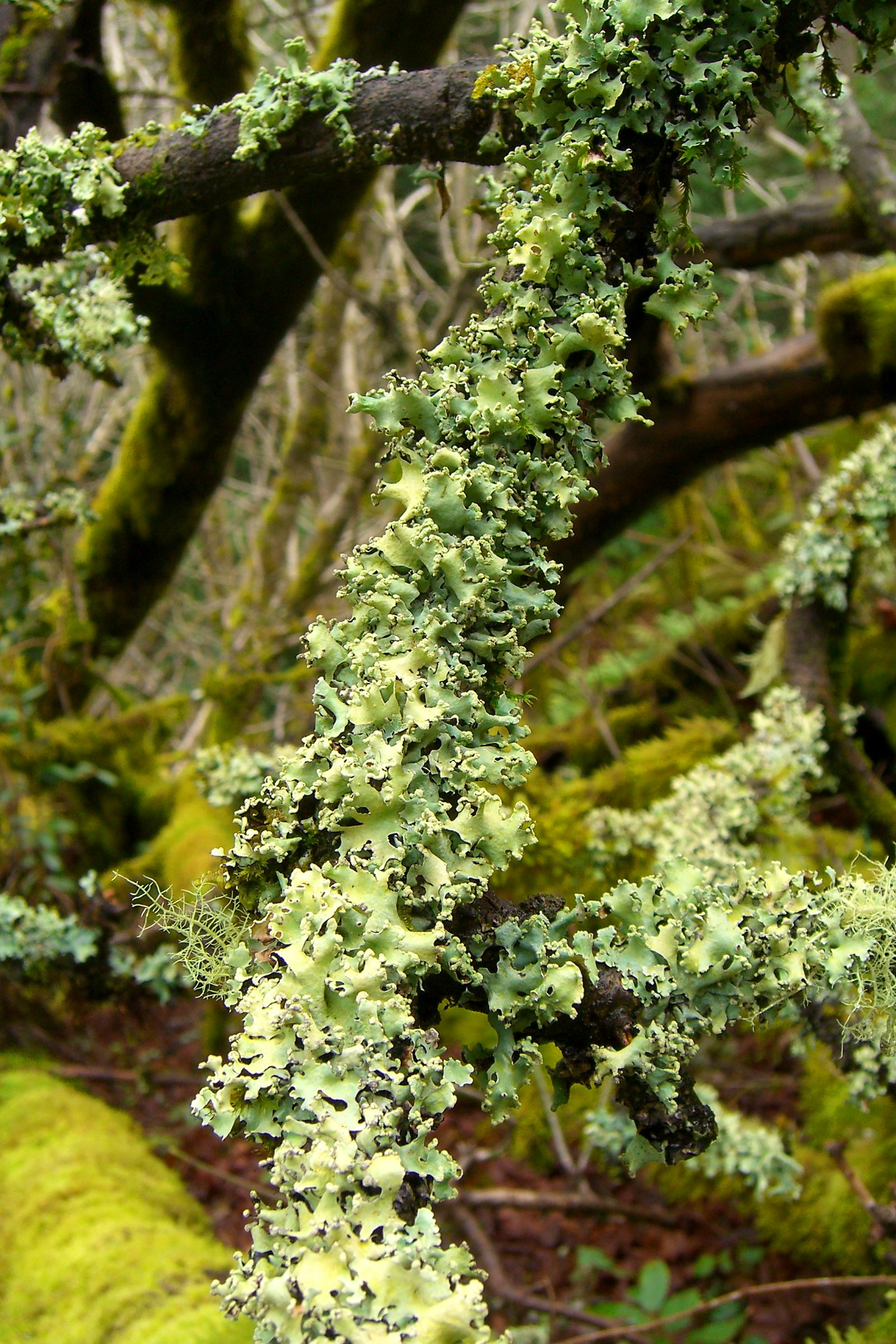
Parmotrema perlatum in Northwestern California growing on a hardwood limb

Parmotrema perlatum typically grows in areas with ample light, favouring neutral to slightly acidic-barked broad-leaved trees. It is commonly found on siliceous rocks and walls, as well as mossy coastal rocks, generally growing in places with moderate to strong sunlight. In the Great Smoky Mountains National Park in the United States, Parmotrema perlatum is especially abundant on branches in humid, high-elevation habitats. Similarly, in East Africa, it grows in the misty environments of inselbergs, montane forests, and Erica-dominated habitats, typically found between 1,400 and 3,100 m (4,600 and 10,200 ft) above sea level.

The species is globally distributed, found in both temperate and tropical regions. It has been reported across numerous European countries including Austria, Belgium, the Czech Republic, France, Germany, Great Britain, Ireland, Italy, Luxembourg, the Netherlands, Portugal, Scandinavia, Slovakia, Spain, and Ukraine. Although it is rare in Eastern Europe, it is widely distributed in both the Asian and European parts of Russia. Beyond Europe, it is also present in Macaronesia, Africa, Australia, North America, and South America. Its Asian distribution includes India, Japan, Taiwan, and South Korea. Although it has historically been recorded in Nepal and Sri Lanka, these reports are considered tentative due to shifting species concepts and possible confusion with the lookalike Parmotrema pseudonilgherrense.

Parmotrema perlatum is globally widespread lichen found on all continents except Antarctica and predominantly in oceanic areas in Europe, primarily grows on bark and occasionally on siliceous rocks amongst mosses. While it is seeing an increase in the Netherlands due to global warming, it is critically endangered in the Czech Republic, Slovakia, and Poland due to susceptibility to air pollution, and is listed as extinct in certain regional Red Data Books due to a lack of recent findings. In contrast, it has been increasing in sightings in the Netherlands, a phenomenon attributed to both global warming decreases in the levels or air pollution in recent decades. Its recent recurrence in Hungary, particularly on some unusual hosts (Catalpa bignonioides, Prunus serotina, and Robinia pseudoacacia) have been suggested as a possible consequence of "a recolonisation process, due to the improving air quality".

== Ecology ==
Parmotrema perlatum is an important species within specific lichen communities in British woodlands, particularly those in late successional mesotrophic settings in oceanic or humid microclimates. It is associated with the Type K Lobaria pulmonaria-Isothecium myosuroides ecological community. This community type is characterised by its occurrence in mature mesotrophic environments, which are often warmer in winter climates or specific microhabitats. This community includes, in addition to P. perlatum, dominant foliose lichens like Lobaria pulmonaria, Hypotrachyna taylorensis, and Parmotrema crinitum, as well as bryophytes such as Isothecium myosuroides.

A 2017 study investigated the physiological responses of Parmotrema perlatum along an aridity gradient in Southern Portugal. The researchers transplanted thalli of P. perlatum to rural and forested sites characterised by varying levels of aridity and measured several physiological parameters, including photosynthetic performance, pigment content, ergosterol content, and sample viability, both before and after a six-month exposure period. The study found that P. perlatum showed lower photosynthetic performance (measured as FV/FM and the performance index on an absorption basis, PIABS) in drier sites compared to more humid sites. In humid environments, the content of photosynthetic pigments increased post-exposure, while in drier sites, this increase was less pronounced. Additionally, ergosterol content was lower in drier sites, indicating a stress response to arid conditions. These results highlight that P. perlatum's physiological responses are significantly influenced by water availability. The ability to maintain higher photosynthetic performance and pigment content in humid conditions suggests that P. perlatum is better adapted to environments with higher moisture levels. This adaptability makes P. perlatum useful as a bioindicator for monitoring ecological responses to climate change and varying moisture conditions in Mediterranean ecosystems.

Lichenicolous (lichen-dwelling) fungi that have been recorded parasitising Parmotrema perlatum include Abrothallus parmotrematis, Briancoppinsia cytospora, Lichenoconium erodens, and Spirographa lichenicola.

== Conservation ==
Parmotrema perlatum has been identified as a species of concern in some regions due to its rarity and declining populations. In Hungary, it has been proposed for 'endangered' status in the Hungarian lichen red list, reflecting its limited distribution and the pressures it faces in its natural habitats there. Similarly, in Ukraine, the species is listed in the Red Data Book of Ukraine with the status of "Rare". Additionally, Parmotrema perlatum is red-listed in Sweden In northern North America, its NatureServe conservation status is designated as "G4", meaning "apparently secure" at the global level. In the United States, it has been assessed as secure in Kentucky and presumed extirpated in Wisconsin, while in Canada, it is considered as vulnerable in British Columbia and Ontario, and critically imperiled in New Brunswick.

== Uses ==
=== As a spice ===
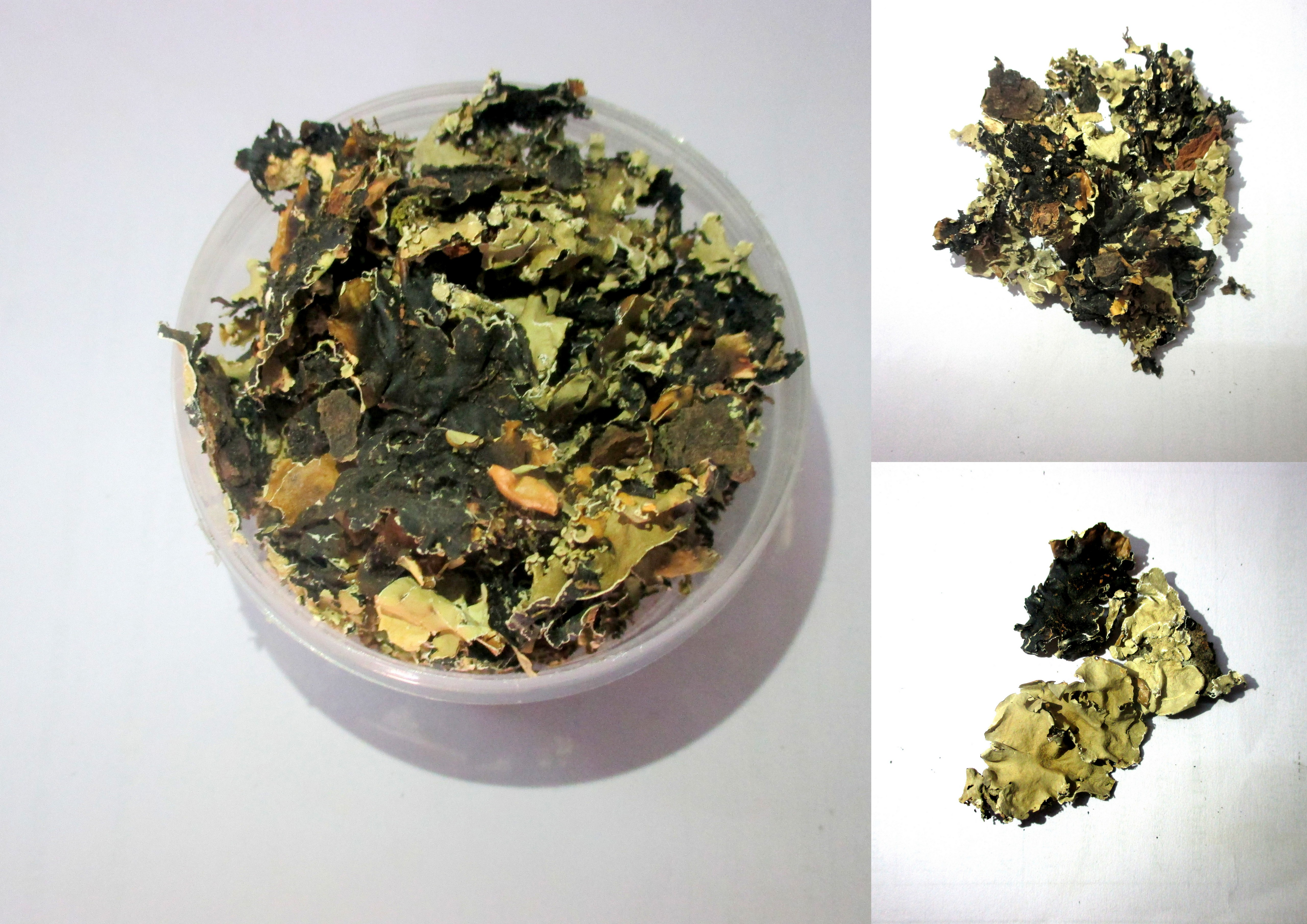
Parmotrema perlatum as the dried spice, kalpaasi

Parmotrema perlatum is used as a spice, particularly in the cuisine of Tamil Nadu. It is especially prevalent in Chettinad cuisine, being used in the popular rice dish biryani, and also in many meat and vegetarian dishes.

In its raw state, black stone flower does not have much taste or fragrance. However, when put in contact with heat, especially hot cooking oil or ghee, it releases a distinctive earthy, smoky flavour and aroma. This property of black stone flower is especially valued in the tempering step of cooking a number of Indian dishes.

The spice is also integral to various regional masalas throughout the Indian subcontinent. Parmotrema perlatum is a key ingredient in masalas such as Kala and Goda masala of Maharashtra, Anglo-Indian bottle masala, bhojwar masala from Hyderabad, and potli masala in Lucknow. It is what many cooks and commercial spice blend makers believe sets apart accomplished dishes from those made by amateurs. Despite its lack of a specific aroma or describable flavour in its raw form, its contribution to the complex flavour profile of these spice blends is highly valued.

=== Dyeing ===
A natural purple dye extracted from Parmotrema perlatum using ammonia fermentation showed optimal results, with a notable dye yield and effective application on silk fabric. The study demonstrated the dye's potential as a sustainable alternative to synthetic dyes, with satisfactory colour fastness and fabric strength enhancement.

Recent research highlights the antimicrobial, antioxidant, and photocatalytic capabilities of zinc oxide nanoparticles synthesised using Parmotrema perlatum, marking a significant step towards sustainable dyeing practices and broadening the lichen's applicative horizons.

=== Traditional medicines ===
Parmotrema perlatum is used as a component of a herbal mixture in Ayurvedic medicine, one of several parmelioid lichen species used as charila. Referenced in ancient Ayurvedic texts and first mentioned in the Atharvaveda around 1500 BCE, charila is a lichen mixture traditionally used in India for its purported medicinal properties. It has been employed to treat various ailments, including digestive and respiratory issues, skin conditions, and reproductive health concerns, and it also serves as an ingredient in treatments for infertility. For chronic ulcers, a powder made from dried lichen, infused in pork suet, is applied externally.

=== Biomonitoring ===
Parmotrema perlatum is sensitive to air pollution, making it a useful bioindicator. This sensitivity is utilised in the "Hawksworth and Rose" scale, which estimates mean winter sulphur dioxide (SO_{2}) levels in England and Wales by observing lichens on acidic and nutrient-poor bark. According to this scale, P. perlatum is found only in zones 8 to 10, indicating areas with the lowest SO_{2} concentrations, less than 35 micrograms per cubic metre (μg/m^{3}).

A 2022 study analyzed the effects of SO_{2} and nitrogen dioxide (NO_{2}) fumigation on the chlorophyll content of Parmotrema perlatum collected from the Mount Lawu volcano in Indonesia. The results indicated that increased exposure to these pollutants leads to a significant reduction in chlorophyll levels. The study demonstrated that SO_{2} and NO_{2} negatively impact the physiological processes of the lichen, particularly its photosynthetic efficiency, demonstrating the sensitivity of P. perlatum to air pollution.

Parmotrema perlatum has been effectively used in biomonitoring studies to assess environmental radioactivity. Research conducted in Turkey found that this lichen species retains radioactive caesium-137 (^{137}Cs) from atmospheric deposition, such as fallout from the Chernobyl accident. The ecological half-life of ^{137}Cs in Parmotrema perlatum was determined to be approximately 5.5 years, indicating its capability to monitor long-term radioactive contamination in the environment.

== Research ==
Research on the bioactive properties of Parmotrema perlatum has revealed several findings. The methanol extract of this species has been shown to significantly reduce blood glucose levels in streptozotocin-induced diabetic rats, attributed to its inhibitory activity on alpha-glucosidase rather than an effect on insulin secretion. This extract also has a high phenolic content and moderate antioxidant capacity, which could help prevent secondary complications of diabetes. The antioxidant potential and free radical-scavening activity of P. perlatum extracts has been further demonstrated through various chemical assays.

Additionally, Parmotrema perlatum has some antimicrobial properties. The crude polysaccharide fraction of this lichen demonstrated antibacterial activity against Escherichia coli and Staphylococcus aureus, which are common pathogens in diabetic foot ulcers. Furthermore, extracts from this species showed significant antiviral activity against the yellow fever virus envelope. Tests against the Gram-negative bacteria Pseudomonas aeruginosa, Chromobacterium violaceum, and Gram-positive Lactobacillus plantarum showed that the methanol extract had the highest antibacterial activity among the three solvent extracts evaluated.

In terms of cytotoxic and anticancer activities, the n-hexane, diethyl ether, and methanol extracts of Parmotrema perlatum have been studied against various cancer cell lines, with the n-hexane extract showing the highest cytotoxic effects. The extracts were particularly effective against murine Lewis lung carcinoma and human glioblastoma cell lines.

== See also ==
- List of Parmotrema species
