= Aquaspirillum dispar =

Scientific classification
- Domain: Bacteria
- Kingdom: Pseudomonadati
- Phylum: Pseudomonadota
- Class: Betaproteobacteria
- Order: Neisseriales
- Family: Neisseriaceae
- Genus: Aquaspirillum
- Species: A. dispar

Binomial name
- Aquaspirillum dispar Hylemon et al. 1973

Species of bacterium

Aquaspirillum dispar is a species of Aquaspirillum that is also known as Microvirgula aerodenitrificans Patureau.

== Microvirgula Dispute ==
Several studies show that Aquaspirillum dispar and Microvirgula aerodenitrificans have a rDNA similarity of greater that 99%. It has been proposed that the name Aquaspirillum dispar cease to be relevant because Microvirgula aerodenitrificans is the type species of Microvirgula. However, no official action has been made, so Aquaspirillum dispar is still relevant.
