= Aquaspirillum fasciculus =

Scientific classification
- Domain: Bacteria
- Kingdom: Pseudomonadati
- Phylum: Pseudomonadota
- Class: Betaproteobacteria
- Order: Neisseriales
- Family: Neisseriaceae
- Genus: Aquaspirillum
- Species: A. fasciculus

Binomial name
- Aquaspirillum fasciculus Strength 1976

Species of bacterium

Aquaspirillum fasciculus is a gram-negative freshwater rod in the genus Aquaspirillum.

== Description ==
The species lives in freshwater and propels itself through flagella.
