= Chicken Chettinad =

Chicken curry dish from South India

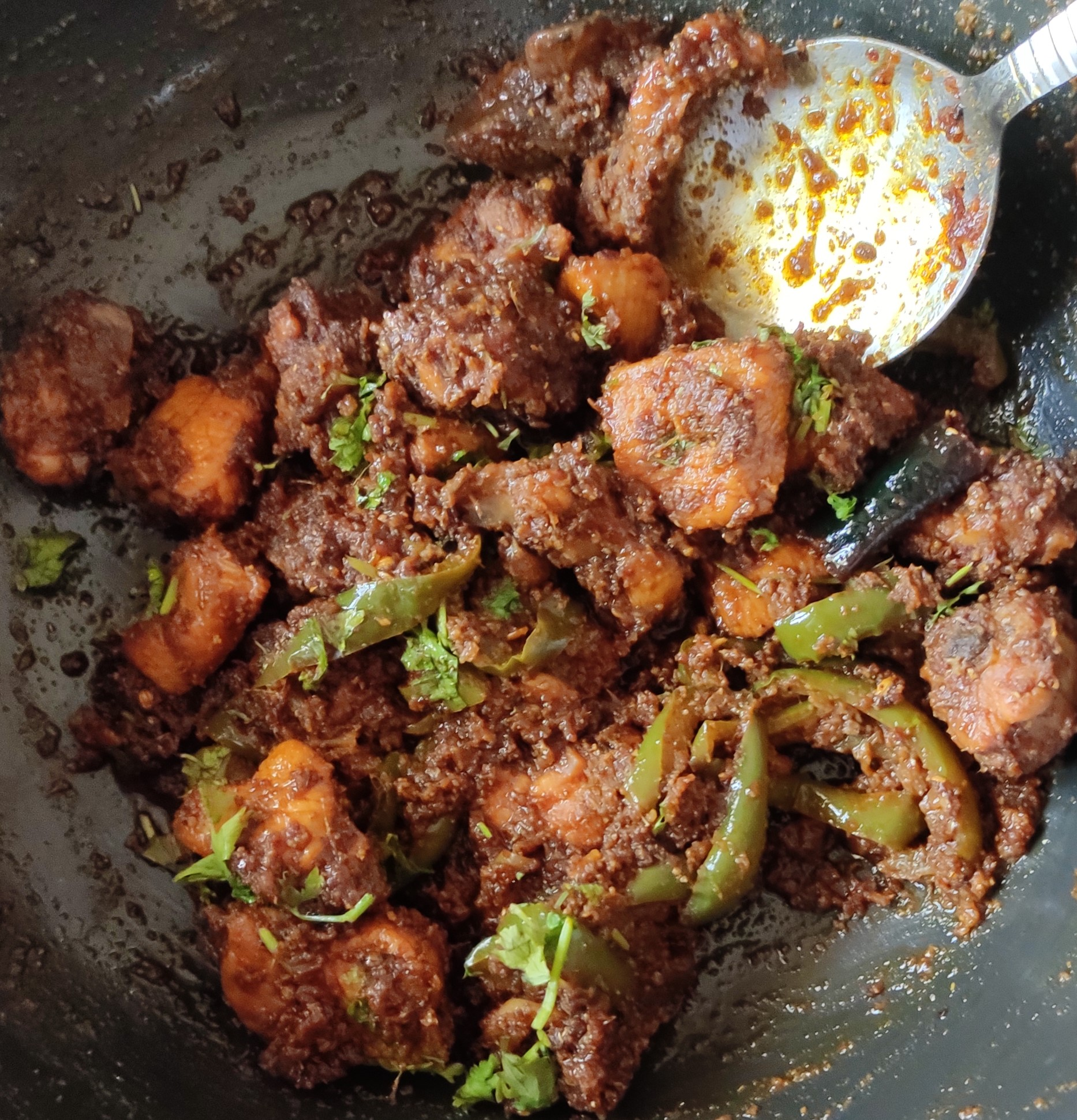
- Chicken Chettinad
- Alternative names: Chettinadin Chicken
- Place of origin: India
- Region or state: Chettinad, Tamil Nadu
- Associated cuisine: Indian
- Main ingredients: Chicken, kalpasi, yogurt, cream, tomato, onion, garlic, ginger, chili pepper, black pepper, coconut

Chicken Chettinad or Chettinad chicken is a classic Indian recipe, from the cuisine of Chettinad in Tamil Nadu, India. It consists of chicken marinated in yogurt, turmeric and a paste of red chillies, kalpasi, coconut, poppy seeds, coriander seeds, cumin seeds, fennel seeds, black pepper, ground nuts, onions, garlic and sesame oil. It is served hot and garnished with coriander leaves, accompanied with boiled rice, porotta.

== See also ==
- List of chicken dishes
