= Laribacter hongkongensis =

Scientific classification
- Domain: Bacteria
- Kingdom: Pseudomonadati
- Phylum: Pseudomonadota
- Class: Betaproteobacteria
- Order: Neisseriales
- Family: Neisseriaceae
- Genus: Laribacter
- Species: L. hongkongensis

Binomial name
- Laribacter hongkongensis Yuen et al. 2002

Species of bacterium

Laribacter hongkongensis is a species of bacteria. It is facultatively anaerobic, non-sporulating, gram-negative, seagull- or spiral rod-shaped. It is a potential human pathogen. Laribacter hongkongensis has been isolated from human cases of diarrhea, but its role in causing diarrhea is unproven, even though it has been hypothesized. Additional studies are needed to better define its role as a possible enteric pathogen. These should include: case control studies designed to differentiate infection from colonization-transient passage, fulfilling Koch's postulates and Bradford-Hill's criteria on association vs. causation, possible virulence factors, animal models, host factors, antibody responses based on serodiagnostic testing, and human volunteer studies. The lessons learned from trying to establish the etiological role of the bacteria genera Aeromonas, Plesiomonas, and Edwardsiella in human diarrhea seem especially applicable for Laribacter. All four genera are isolated from extraintestinal infections, are apparently found in the aquatic environment, and epidemiological associations include eating fish and foreign travel. Even after over 50 years' experience with the former three genera their etiological role in an individual case of human diarrhea is difficult to determine without extensive studies. For all four of these genera the critical issue will be differentiating infection from colonization or transient passage in the intestine.
