= Aquaspirillum putridiconchylium =

Scientific classification
- Domain: Bacteria
- Kingdom: Pseudomonadati
- Phylum: Pseudomonadota
- Class: Betaproteobacteria
- Order: Neisseriales
- Family: Neisseriaceae
- Genus: Aquaspirillum
- Species: A. putridiconchylium

Binomial name
- Aquaspirillum putridiconchylium (Terasaki 1961) Hylemon et al. 1973

Species of bacterium

Aquaspirillum putridiconchylium is a species of Aquaspirillum that has a unique spiral rod. It is grown best in 25-30 degrees Celsius. Cultures are usually found in pond water.
