= Aquaspirillum bengal =

Scientific classification
- Domain: Bacteria
- Kingdom: Pseudomonadati
- Phylum: Pseudomonadota
- Class: Betaproteobacteria
- Order: Neisseriales
- Family: Neisseriaceae
- Genus: Aquaspirillum
- Species: A. bengal

Binomial name
- Aquaspirillum bengal Kumar et al. 1974

Species of bacterium

Aquaspirillum bengal is a Gram negative bacterium in the genus Aquaspirillum.

== Description ==
The species is helical in shape and moves in water through flagella. The cell is 0.9 to 1.2 μm in diameter and 5.2 to 22.0 μm in length.
