= Chettinad cuisine =

Type of cuisine from Tamil Nadu, India

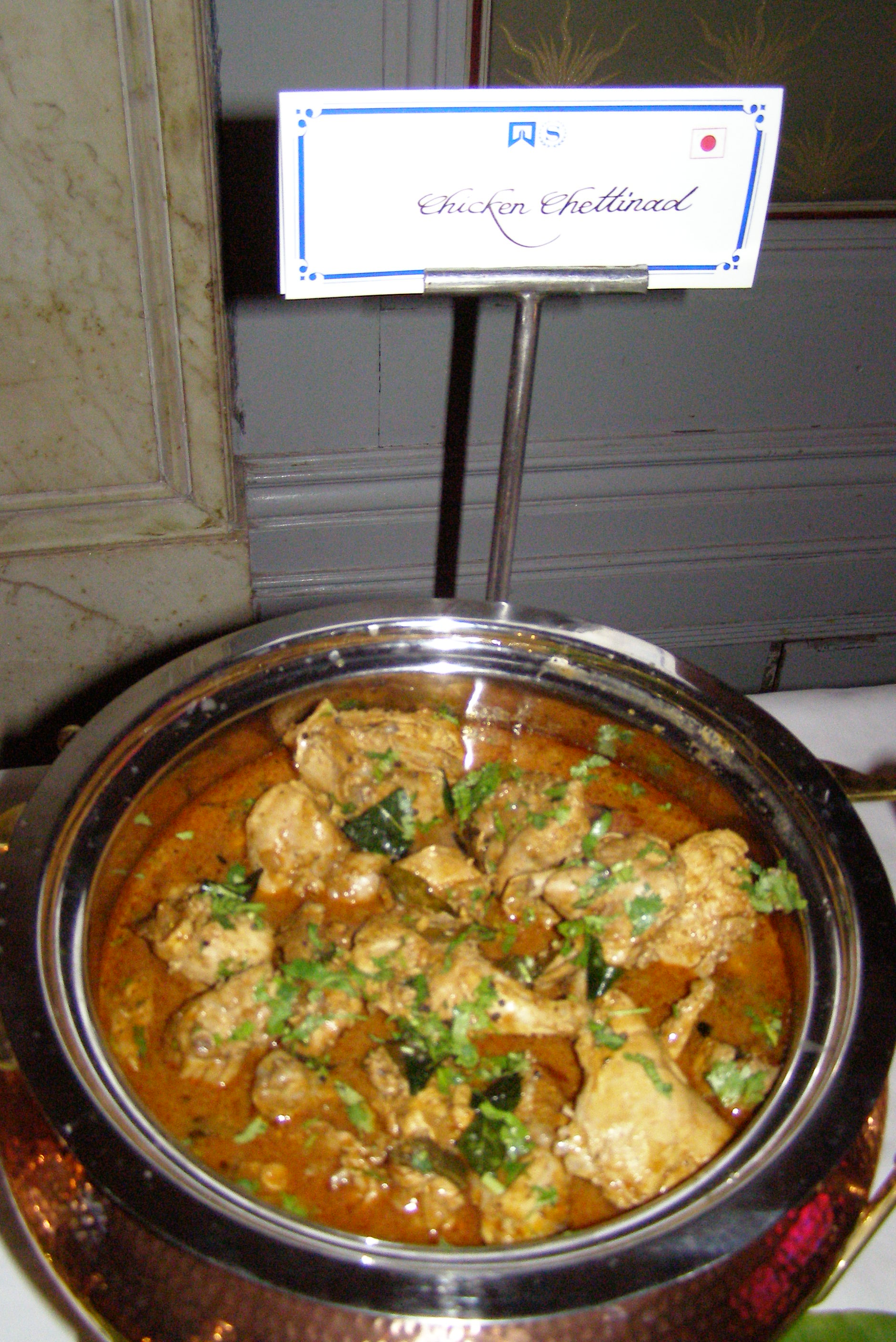
Chicken Chettinad, popular dish from the region

Chettinadu cuisine is the cuisine of a community called the Nagarathars, from the Chettinad region in Sivaganga district of Tamil Nadu state in India. Chettinad cuisine is perhaps the most renowned fare in the Tamil Nadu repertoire. It uses a variety of spices and the dishes are made with fresh ground masalas. Chettiars also use a variety of sun-dried meats and salted vegetables, reflecting the dry environment of the region. Most of the dishes are eaten with rice and rice based accompaniments such as dosas, appams, idiyappams, adais and idlis. The Chettiars, through their mercantile contacts with Burma, learnt to prepare a type of rice pudding made with sticky red rice. The chefs of Manapatti village near Singampunari are experts in cooking Chettinad cuisine.

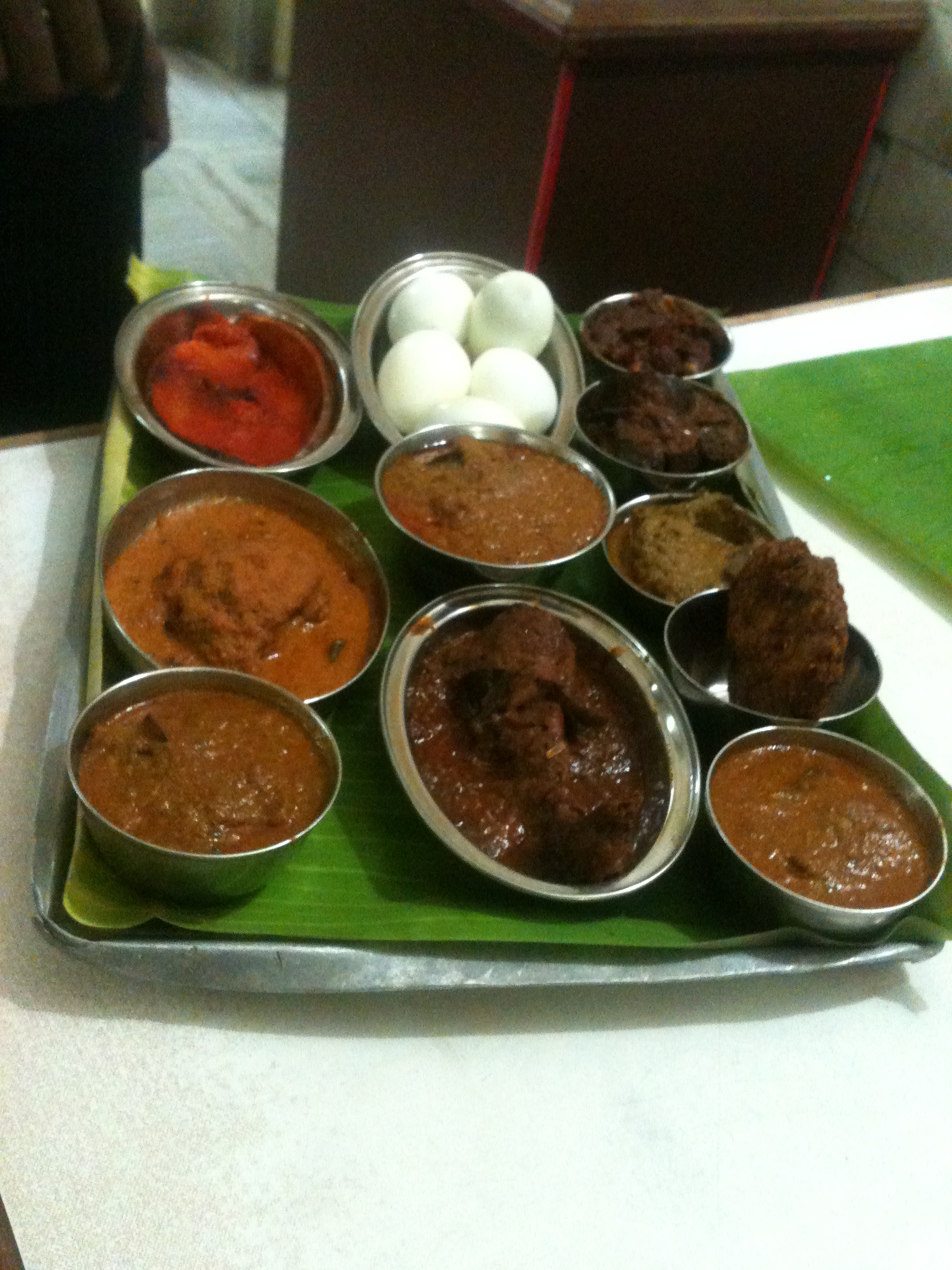
A non-vegetarian dish sample tray in Chettinad Hotel

== Dishes ==
Chettinad cuisine offers a variety of vegetarian and non-vegetarian dishes. Some of the popular vegetarian dishes include idiyappam, paniyaram, vellai paniyaram, karuppatti paniyaram, paal paniyaram, kuzhi paniyaram, kozhukatta, masala paniyaram, aadikoozh, kandharappam, seeyam, masala seeyam, kavuni arisi, maavurundai, and athirasam. The most common meats used in Chettinad cuisine are goat, chicken, mutton, and marine fish.

== Spices ==
In Chettinad food, major spices used include anasipoo (star aniseed), kalpasi (a lichen), puli (tamarind), milagai (chillies), sombu (fennel seed), pattai (cinnamon), lavangam (cloves), punnai ilai (bay leaf), karu milagu (peppercorn), jeeragam (cumin seeds), and venthayam (fenugreek).

== Historical influences ==
Chettinad cuisine is notable for its myriad of culinary influences from Southeast Asia, derived from the inhabitants of the region being greatly involved in the maritime trade throughout the Indian Ocean for centuries. Burmese cuisine in particular has a large influence on Chettinad fare, reflected in the usage of fermented and dried prawns and fish for flavor, as well as pickles and rice dishes inspired by Burmese cuisine, such as Burmese black rice or burma kavuni arisi, an heirloom rice cultivar used by residents of Chettinad to make idiyappam, pongal, sticky rice pudding, and other delicacies. Burmese noodle dishes and mohinga are also popular in the Chennai area; they were brought to the region by Myanmar Tamils of the Chettiar community who were deported en masse during the Burmese dictatorship of Ne Win.

In the 2014 book The Bangala Table: Flavor and Recipes from Chettinad by Sumeet Nair and Meenakshi Meyyappan, historian S. Muthiah writes:

The Chettiars have traditionally been vegetarians. Their feasts at lifestyle ritual functions remain vegetarian. But trade once had them criss-crossing the southern reaches of peninsular India and absorbing non-vegetarian influences from the Malabar Coast, where Christians of the Orthodoxy of West Asia and Muslims lived in large numbers and Hindus too tended to non-vegetarianism. Further non-vegetarian influences became entrenched in Chettiar food habits from the late 18th Century after they established businesses in Ceylon, Burma, the Dutch East Indies, French Indo-China and what is now Malaysia and Singapore. So did non-vegetarian fare from other parts of India through which they traveled en route to their overseas businesses.

Writer Guy Trebay adds in the foreword of the same book:

One is lucky to eat like a Chettiar, they say in South India. Chettiars say it themselves. They say it because a Chettiar table is a groaning board but also because the cuisine is uncommonly subtle and aromatic, a heritage of Chettiar participation in the centuries-old spice trade, the global import and export of pungent seeds and fruits and barks from places like Cochin and Penang, the Banda Islands, Arab ports in the Straits of Hormuz. To the coconut and rice and legumes that are staples of South Indian cooking they added Tellicherry pepper, Ceylon cardamom, Indonesian nutmeg, Madagascar cloves and blue ginger, or galangal, from Laos and Vietnam.

In places like Penang, in what is now Malaysia, the Chettiars developed a liking for the sweet-sour piquancy of Straits Chinese cooking, [sic] In Saigon, they adapted their cuisine to absorb the herbs that perfume Vietnamese food. In Buddhist Ceylon, they relaxed their dietary prohibitions typical of orthodox Hindus and came to enjoy meat.

Thus, the Chettinad region—a semi-arid zone comprising scores of villages, sleepy and agrarian, studded with important ancient temples yet far from major commercial centers—became an unlikely locus of internationalized tastes.

== See also ==
- Tamil cuisine
