= Morococcus =

Scientific classification
- Domain: Bacteria
- Kingdom: Pseudomonadati
- Phylum: Pseudomonadota
- Class: Betaproteobacteria
- Order: Neisseriales
- Family: Neisseriaceae
- Genus: Morococcus; Long et al. 1981
- Species: M. cerebrosus

Binomial name
- Morococcus cerebrosus Long et al. 1981

Genus of bacteria

Morococcus is a genus in the phylum Proteobacteria (Bacteria).

== Etymology ==
The name Morococcus derives from: Latin noun morum, mulberry; New Latin masculine gender noun coccus (from Greek masculine gender noun kokkos (κόκκος), grain, seed), coccus; New Latin masculine gender noun Morococcus, the mulberry coccus.

== Species ==
The genus contains a single species, Morococcus cerebrosus (Long et al. 1981, (type species of the genus)). ; Latin masculine gender adjective cerebrosus, having a madness of the brain, hare-brained, hotbrained, passionate; intended to mean pertaining to the brain, the original source of isolation of this organism.
