= Microvirgula aerodenitrificans =

Scientific classification
- Domain: Bacteria
- Kingdom: Pseudomonadati
- Phylum: Pseudomonadota
- Class: Betaproteobacteria
- Order: Neisseriales
- Family: Neisseriaceae
- Genus: Microvirgula
- Species: M. aerodenitrificans

Binomial name
- Microvirgula aerodenitrificans Patureau et al. 1998

Species of bacterium

Microvirgula aerodenitrificans is a species of bacteria, the only species in its genus. It is a Gram-negative, catalase-and oxidase-positive, curved rod-shaped and motile denitrifier. It is aerobic as well as an anoxic heterotroph, having an atypical respiratory type of metabolism in which oxygen and nitrogen oxides are used simultaneously as terminal electron acceptors. SGLY2^{T} is its type strain.
