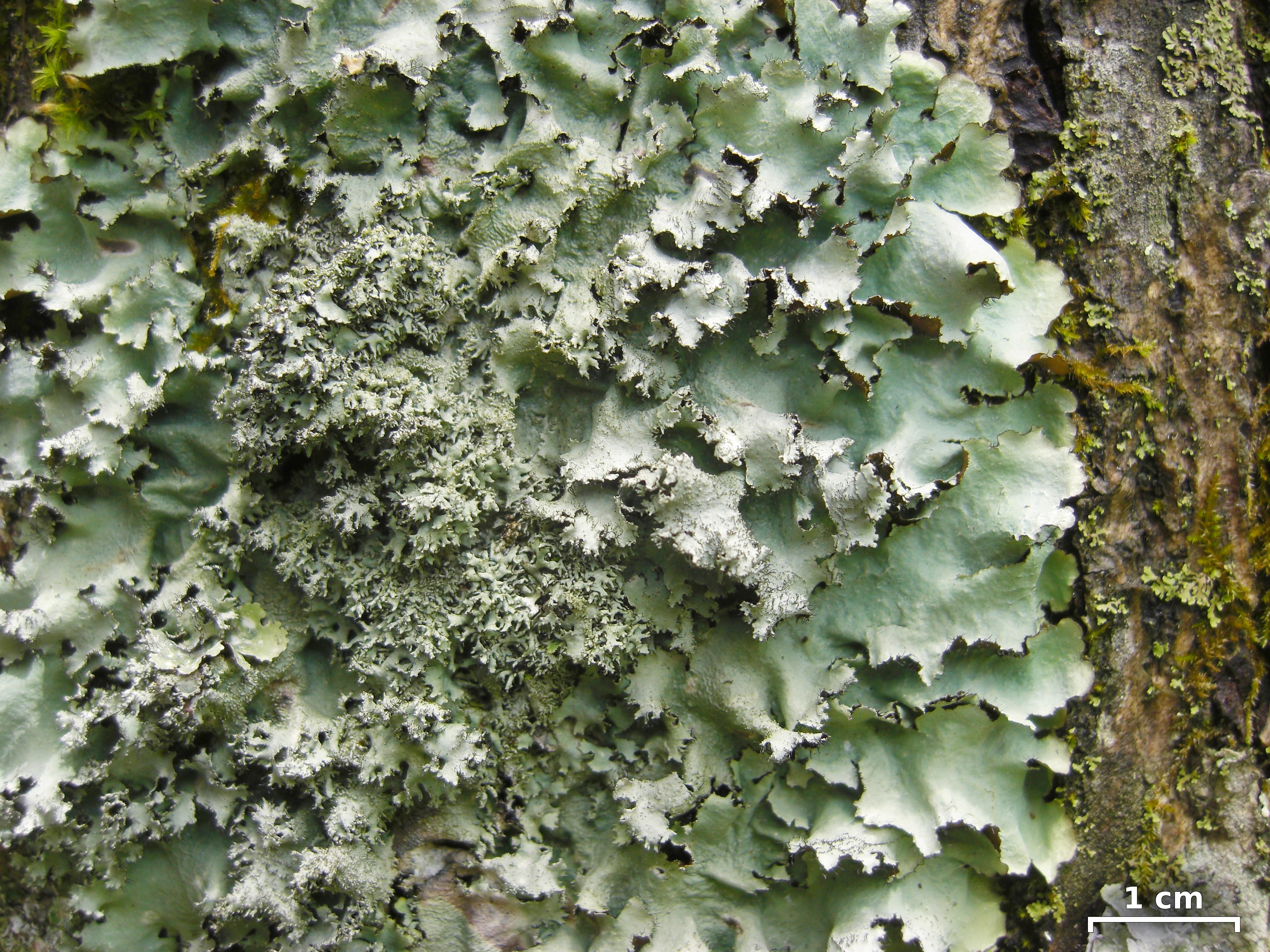

Conservation status
- Least Concern (IUCN 3.1)

- Secure (NatureServe)

Scientific classification
- Kingdom: Fungi
- Division: Ascomycota
- Class: Lecanoromycetes
- Order: Lecanorales
- Family: Parmeliaceae
- Genus: Parmotrema
- Species: P. crinitum

Binomial name
- Parmotrema crinitum (Ach.) M.Choisy (1952)

Synonyms
- List: Parmelia crinita Ach. (1814); Parmelia proboscidea Taylor (1836); Parmelia perforata subsp. crinita (Ach.) Tuck. (1882); Imbricaria crinita (Ach.) Arnold (1884); Imbricaria proboscidea (Taylor) Jatta (1890)

= Parmotrema crinitum =

Species of lichen

Parmotrema crinitum, the salted ruffle lichen, is a species of corticolous (bark-dwelling), foliose lichen in the family Parmeliaceae. It was formally described as a new species in 1814 by the Swedish lichenologist Erik Acharius, as Parmelia crinita. Maurice Choisy transferred it to the genus Parmotrema in 1952.

== See also ==
- List of Parmotrema species
