= Aquaphilus =

Scientific classification
- Domain: Bacteria
- Kingdom: Pseudomonadati
- Phylum: Pseudomonadota
- Class: Betaproteobacteria
- Order: Neisseriales
- Family: Neisseriaceae
- Genus: Aquaphilus; Bourrain et al. 2012

Species
- A. dolomiae

Genus of bacteria

Aquaphilus is a genus of gram-negative bacteria from the family of Neisseriaceae with one known species (Aquaphilus dolomiae). A. dolomiae is known to have anti-inflammatory properties.
