= VHb (hemoglobin) =

Type of hemoglobin

Vitreoscilla haemoglobin (VHb) is a type of haemoglobin found in the Gram-negative aerobic bacterium, Vitreoscilla. It is the first haemoglobin discovered from bacteria, but unlike classic haemoglobin it is composed only of a single globin molecule. Like typical haemoglobin, its primary role is binding oxygen, but it also performs other functions including delivery of oxygen to oxygenases, detoxification of nitric oxide, sensing and relaying oxygen concentrations, peroxidase-like activity by eliminating autoxidation-derived H_{2}O_{2} that prevents haeme degradation and iron release.

== Discovery ==
In 1986, a bacterial (Vitreoscilla) heme protein that had been studied by Webster and his colleagues, was sequenced and this amino acid sequence exhibited the globin folds of a haemoglobin. It consists of a single domain which normally occurs as a dimer. The solution of its crystal structure confirmed that its 3-dimensional structure is remarkably similar to the classic globin fold. When the gene (vgb) for this haemoglobin was cloned into E. coli it was found that it increased the growth of these cells under low oxygen conditions compared to control bacteria. The concentration of VHb drastically increased in Vitreoscilla, a strict aerobe, grown under hypoxic conditions, and it was proposed that it acted as an "oxygen storage trap" to feed oxygen to the terminal oxidase (cytochrome bo) under these conditions. Further evidence for this is that VHb is concentrated in vivo near the membrane of Vitreoscilla cells. It was also shown that VHb binds to subunit I of the cytochrome bo terminal oxidase, the heme-containing subunit that is also responsible for the unique sodium pumping function of this unique terminal oxidase.

== Function ==
VHb is the best understood of all the bacterial haemoglobins, and is attributed to play a number of functions. Its main role is likely the binding of oxygen at low concentrations and its direct delivery to the terminal respiratory oxidase(s) such as cytochrome o. It is also involved in the delivery of oxygen to oxygenases, detoxification of nitric oxide by converting it to nitrate, and sensing oxygen concentrations and passing this signal to transcription factors. It has a peroxidase-like activity and effectively eliminates autoxidation-derived H_{2}O_{2}, which is a cause of haeme degradation and iron release.

== Genetic regulation ==
The VHb gene, vgb, exists as a single copy in Vitreoscilla and exhibits complete agreement with the primary sequence of VHb. The downstream region adjacent to vgb carries a gene in the opposite direction having close similarity with the uvrA gene of E. coli, indicating that vgb is not part of a multigene operon. Biosynthesis of VHb is regulated at the transcriptional level and is induced under hypoxia in its native host. vgb is expressed strongly in E. coli through its native promoter and a similar increase in its transcript level occurs under hypoxia; this suggests a close similarity in the transcriptional machinery of Vitreoscilla and E. coli. The promoter region of vgb is crowded with overlapping binding sites for several redox-sensitive transcriptional regulators, involving the fumarate and nitrate reduction (Fnr) system as primary regulator. The catabolite repression (Crp) system is an additional control along with the aerobic respiration control (Arc) system as a third oxygen-dependent controller. Another binding site for the oxidative stress response regulator (OxyR) is also present within the vgb promoter; all these transcriptional regulators appear to work in coordination with each other to control the biosynthesis of VHb in a redox dependent manner.

== Genetic engineering and applications ==
Since it was shown that VHb stimulated the growth of E. coli under hypoxic conditions, vgb was cloned into a variety of organisms, including various bacteria, yeast, fungi, and even higher plants and animals to test its effects on growth and production of products of potential commercial importance, the degradation of toxic compounds, the enhancement of nitrification in wastewater treatment, and other environmental applications.

Examples of increased productivity include increased yield of a variety of biochemicals including antibiotics, an insecticide, a surfactant, and potential plastic feedstocks. They also include enzymes (including one which might have anti-leukemic properties), and fuels (including ethanol, butanediol, and biodiesel). The toxic compounds studied have been aromatics including 2-chlorobenzoic acid and 2,4-dinitrotolene. In these cases, increases in degradation are thought to be due both to the effects of VHb enhancing respiration to provide cells with additional ATP for growth and production of degrading enzymes, and delivery of oxygen directly to the oxygenases required for early steps in the degradative pathways.

Other environmental investigations include those related to heavy metal remediation and provision of soil phosphate to plants. Expression of vgb in Nitrosomonas europaea, a bacterium involved of conversion of ammonia to nitrite in wastewater, enhanced, to some degree, its ability in this conversion. Furthermore, it was shown that the mechanism of haeme protein expression to enhance oxygen supply to the monooxygenase in nitrification under hypoxic conditions is similar to VHb function seen in other applications.

Amino acid residues in several sections of VHb in proximity to the haeme were altered using genetic engineering to change VHb's affinity for oxygen and to examine the effects on the biotechnological properties of some of the systems studied. Many of the mutations did not have large effects on the ligand binding properties of VHb, or provided at best a modest increase in cell growth compared with cells harboring wild type VHb. Two of the mutant VHb's, however, provided substantial increases in growth and aromatic compound degradation compared to wild type VHb in Pseudomonas and Burkholderia bacteria transformed to contain vgb.
