= Laribacter =

Scientific classification
- Domain: Bacteria
- Kingdom: Pseudomonadati
- Phylum: Pseudomonadota
- Class: Betaproteobacteria
- Order: Neisseriales
- Family: Neisseriaceae
- Genus: Laribacter; Yuen et al. 20024

Type species
- Laribacter hongkongensis

Species
- L. hongkongensis

Genus of bacteria

Laribacter is a bacterial genus in the family of Neisseriaceae. Laribacter hongkongensis is the only species in the genus, and it has been isolated from human cases of diarrhea. However, its role in causing diarrhea is unproven, even though it has been hypothesized.
