= Bergeriella =

Scientific classification
- Domain: Bacteria
- Kingdom: Pseudomonadati
- Phylum: Pseudomonadota
- Class: Betaproteobacteria
- Order: Neisseriales
- Family: Neisseriaceae
- Genus: Bergeriella; Xie and Yokota 2005

Type species
- Bergeriella denitrificans

Species
- B. denitrificans

Genus of bacteria

Bergeriella is a genus of bacteria from the family of Neisseriaceae with one known species (Bergeriella denitrificans). Bergeriella denitrificans has been isolated from the oral mucosa of a rat.
