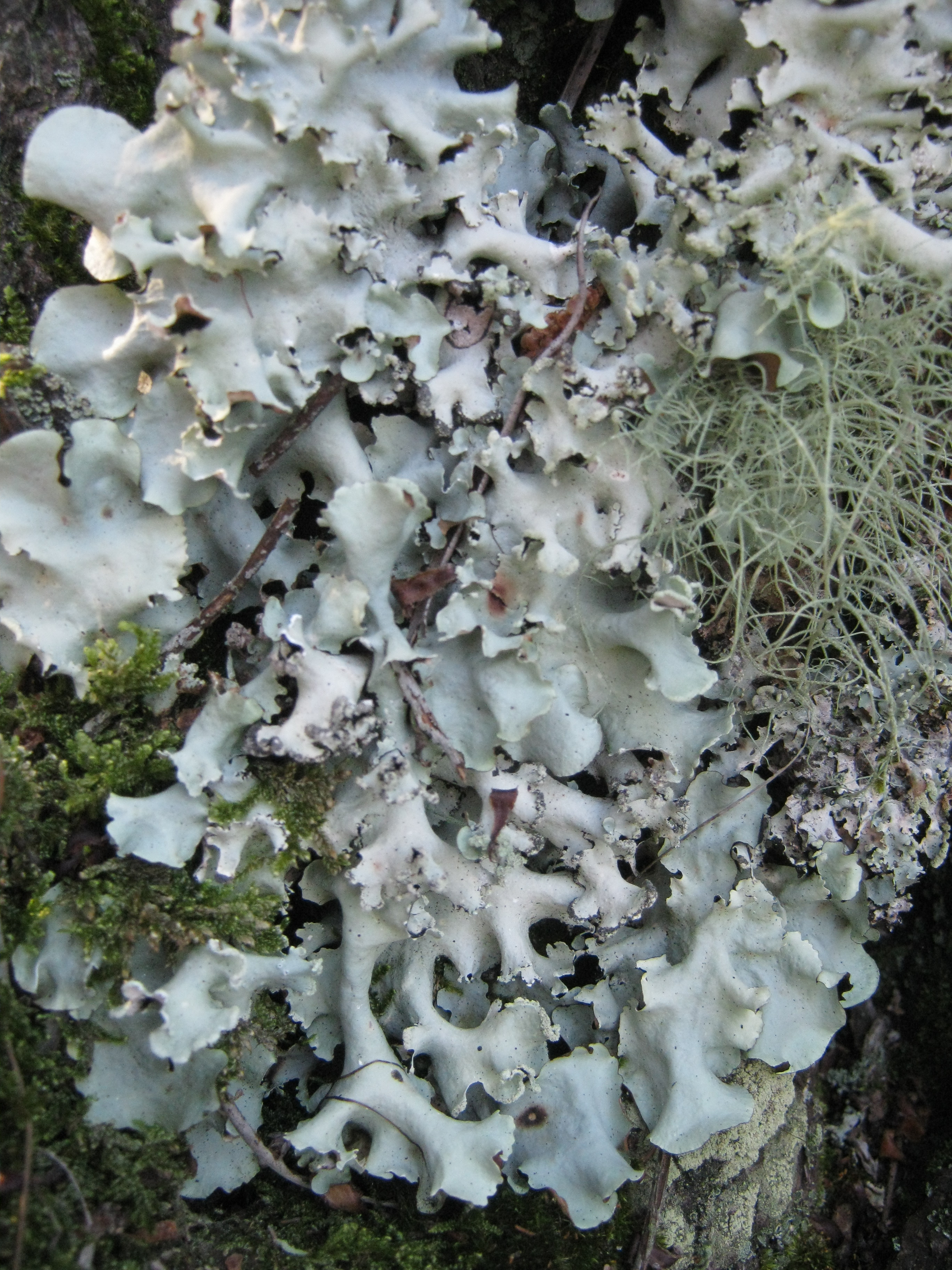

Scientific classification
- Domain: Eukaryota
- Kingdom: Fungi
- Division: Ascomycota
- Class: Lecanoromycetes
- Order: Lecanorales
- Family: Parmeliaceae
- Genus: Parmotrema
- Species: P. robustum

Binomial name
- Parmotrema robustum (Degel.) Hale (1974)

Synonyms
- Parmelia robusta Degel. (1941)

= Parmotrema robustum =

Species of lichen

Parmotrema robustum is a species of corticolous (bark-dwelling), foliose lichen in the family Parmeliaceae. It can be identified by its thin, leaf-like thallus, few (or sometimes no) tiny hair-like structures (cilia) on the edges, short lobes with powdery edges, and a black underside with few root-like structures (rhizines), along with a wide brown area without these structures. It produces specific secondary metabolites (lichen products), including protocetraric acid and atranorin, and sometimes usnic and fatty acids.

The species was first scientifically described by the Swedish lichenologist Gunnar Degelius in 1941. He classified it in the genus Parmelia. Mason Hale transferred it to the then newly circumscribed genus Parmotrema in 1974.

Parmotrema robustum has a widespread distribution, with reports from Europe, eastern Australia, New Zealand, India, Thailand, Papua New Guinea, Macaronesia, and the Neotropics, including Bolivia, Brazil, Colombia, Costa Rica, Ecuador, and Venezuela.

== See also ==
- List of Parmotrema species
