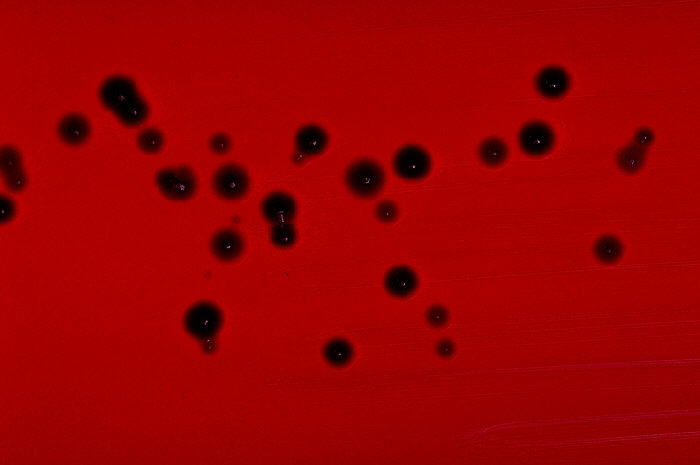
- Blood agar plate culture of Chromobacterium violaceum

Scientific classification
- Domain: Bacteria
- Kingdom: Pseudomonadati
- Phylum: Pseudomonadota
- Class: Betaproteobacteria
- Order: Neisseriales
- Family: Neisseriaceae
- Genus: Chromobacterium; Bergonzini 1880

Type species
- Chromobacterium violaceum

Species
- C. alkanivorans C. amazonense C. aquaticum C. haemolyticum C. phragmitis C. piscinae C. pseudoviolaceum C. rhizoryzae C. subtsugae C. vaccinii C. violaceum

= Chromobacterium =

Genus of bacteria

Chromobacterium is a genus of Gram-negative rod-shaped bacteria. Currently, eleven species within the genus are known, two of those are Chromobacterium violaceum and Chromobacterium subtsugae; the latter was discovered by scientists at the Agricultural Research Service in Beltsville, Maryland.
