= Alysiella =

Scientific classification
- Domain: Bacteria
- Kingdom: Pseudomonadati
- Phylum: Pseudomonadota
- Class: Betaproteobacteria
- Order: Neisseriales
- Family: Neisseriaceae
- Genus: Alysiella; Langeron 1923 (Approved Lists 1980)

Type species
- Alysiella filiformis (Schmid 1922) Langeron 1923 (Approved Lists 1980)

Genus of bacteria

Alysiella is a genus in the phylum Pseudomonadota (Bacteria).

== Etymology ==
The name Alysiella derives from: Greek noun alusion -on, a small chain; Latin dim. ending -ella; New Latin feminine gender dim. noun Alysiella, small chain.

== Species ==
The genus contains 2 species, namely

- Alysiella crassa ( (Schmid 1922) Xie and Yokota 2005, ; Latin feminine gender adjective crassa, thick.)
- Alysiella filiformis ( (Schmid 1922) Langeron 1923, species. (Type species of the genus).; Latin noun filum, thread; Latin adjective suffix -formis -is -e, -like, in the shape of; New Latin feminine gender adjective filiformis, thread shaped, filiform.)
