= Vitreoscilla =

Scientific classification
- Domain: Bacteria
- Kingdom: Pseudomonadati
- Phylum: Pseudomonadota
- Class: Betaproteobacteria
- Order: Neisseriales
- Family: Neisseriaceae
- Genus: Vitreoscilla; Pringsheim 1949

Genus of bacteria

Vitreoscilla is a genus of Gram-negative aerobic bacterium. The bacterial haemoglobin (VHb) was first discovered from Vitreoscilla, and VHb is found to have a wide range of biological and biotechnological applications including promotion of cell growth, protein synthesis, metabolite productivity, respiration, cellular detoxification, fermentation, and biodegradation.

== Etymology ==
The generic name is derived from the Latin adjective vitreus, which means clear or transparent; and the noun oscillum, meaning a swing. Thus Vitreoscilla is used to describe the bacterium as the transparent swing or oscillator, the way it exhibits locomotion.

== Species ==
There are three valid species under the genus, namely

- Vitreoscilla beggiatoides Pringsheim 1949 (type species)
- Vitreoscilla filiformis (ex Pringsheim 1951) Strohl et al. 1986
- Vitreoscilla stercoraria Pringsheim 1951

== Structure ==
Members of Vitreoscilla are obligate aerobic bacteria, which are morphologically colourless filaments that contain cells with diameters of 1-3 μm and 1-12 μm long. Each filament may contain from 1 to 40 cells. Locomotion is by gliding, and no special locomotor organelles are present. The cell walls are composed of the amino acids alanine, glutamate, and diaminopimelic acid, with approximate molar ratios of 2:1:1.

== Importance ==
Vitreoscilla bacteria have a unique property in that they produces a type of haemoglobin, VHb. This molecule unlike classic haemoglobin is composed only of a single globin molecule. VHb is known to have a wide variety of functions including improving cell growth, protein synthesis, enhanced metabolism, nitric oxide detoxification, increase respiration and production of ethanol. Some of these properties have been exploited as potential benefits in biotechnology and industry.

== See also ==
- VHb (hemoglobin)
