= Microvirgula =

Scientific classification
- Domain: Bacteria
- Kingdom: Pseudomonadati
- Phylum: Pseudomonadota
- Class: Betaproteobacteria
- Order: Neisseriales
- Family: Neisseriaceae
- Genus: Microvirgula; Patureau et al. 1998

Type species
- Microvirgula aerodenitrificans

Species
- M. aerodenitrificans

Genus of bacteria

Microvirgula is a Gram-negative bacteria genus from the family of Neisseriaceae. Up to now there is only one species of this genus known (Microvirgula aerodenitrificans).
