= Maurice Choisy =

French botanist and lichenologist

Maurice Gustave Benoît Choisy (29 June 1897 – 19 June 1966) was a French mycologist and lichenologist. He was a member of the Botanical Society of France, the Mycological Society of France, and the Linnean Society of Lyon. He was president of the botanical section of the latter society from 1949 to 1950.

Species named after Choisy include Dermatocarpon choisyi D.D.Awasthi (1965); Haematomma choisyi Werner (1932); and Lecidea choisyi Werner (1932).

== Selected publications ==
- Choisy, M.G.B. (1928). "Existe-t-il un nouveau type de spores en Mycologie?". Bulletin de la Société Royale de Botanique de Belgique (in French). 61 (1): 71–74. JSTOR 20791544.
- ——————— (1931). "Lichens nouveaux". Bulletin de la Société Botanique de France (in French). 78 (4): 453–460. doi:10.1080/00378941.1931.10832910.
- ——————— (1931). "La classification des Gyrophoracés". Bulletin de la Société Royale de Botanique de Belgique (in French). 64 (1): 119–123. JSTOR 20791639.
- ——————— (1949). "Catalogue des lichens de la région lyonnaise [1]. (suite: 1–16)". Bulletin Mensuel de la Société Linnéenne de Lyon (in French). 18 (6): 105–120. doi:10.3406/linly.1949.8557.

== See also ==
- Category:Taxa named by Maurice Choisy
