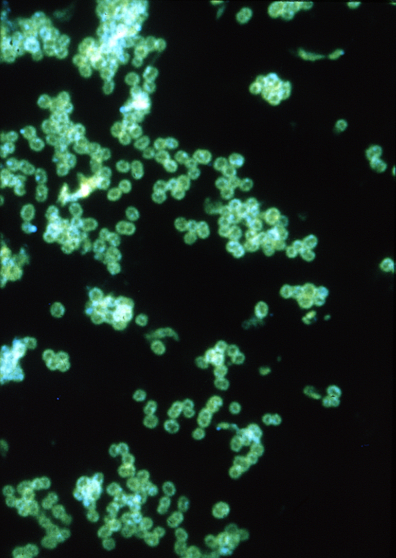
- Neisseria gonorrhoeae

Scientific classification
- Domain: Bacteria
- Kingdom: Pseudomonadati
- Phylum: Pseudomonadota
- Class: Betaproteobacteria
- Order: Neisseriales
- Family: Neisseriaceae; Prévot 1933

Genera
- Alysiella; Aquaphilus; Bergeriella; Aquaspirillum; Chromobacterium; Eikenella; Formivibrio; Iodobacter; Kingella; Laribacter; Microvirgula; Morococcus; Neisseria; Prolinoborus; Simonsiella; Vitreoscilla; Vogesella

= Neisseriaceae =

Family of bacteria

The Neisseriaceae are a family of Pseudomonadota, within the order Neisseriales of Betaproteobacteria. While many organisms in the family are mammalian commensals or part of the normal flora, the genus Neisseria includes two important human pathogens, specifically those responsible for gonorrhea (caused by N. gonorrhoeae) and many cases of meningitis ("meningococcal meningitis", caused by N. meningitidis). As a group, the Neisseriaceae are strictly aerobic and Gram-negative, occur mainly in pairs (diplococci), and typically do not have flagella.
