= List of human microbiota =

Human microbiota are microorganisms (bacteria, viruses, fungi and archaea) found in a specific environment. They can be found in the stomach, intestines, skin, genitals and other parts of the body. Various body parts have diverse microorganisms. Some microbes are specific to certain body parts and others are associated with many microbiomes. This article lists some of the species recognized as belonging to the human microbiome and focuses on the oral, vaginal, ovarian follicle, uterus and the male reproductive tract microbiota.

== Categories of bacteria ==
The "reference" 70 kg human body is estimated to have around 39 trillion bacteria with a mass of about 0.2 kg. These can be separated into about 10,000 microbial species, about 180 of the most studied is listed below here. However, these can broadly be put into three categories:

=== Spheres or ball-shaped (cocci bacteria) ===
Cocci are usually round or spherical in shape. They can form clusters and are non-motile. Examples include Staphylococcus aureus, Streptococcus pyogenes, and Neisseria gonorrhea.

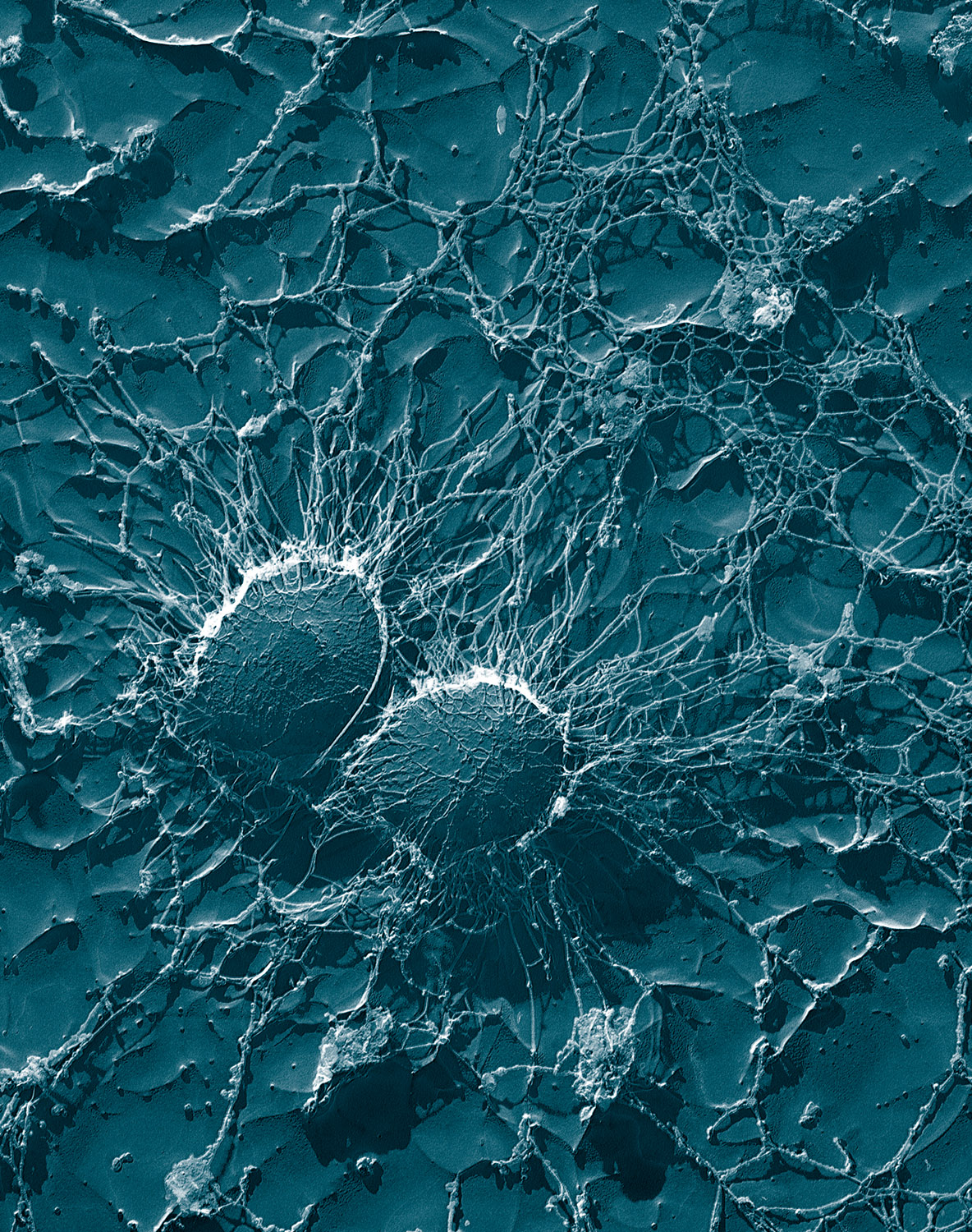
Staphylococcus aureus

=== Rod-shaped bacteria (bacilli) ===
Bacilli usually have a rod or cylinder shape. Examples include Listeria, Salmonella typhimurium, Yersinia enterocolitica, and Escherichia coli.

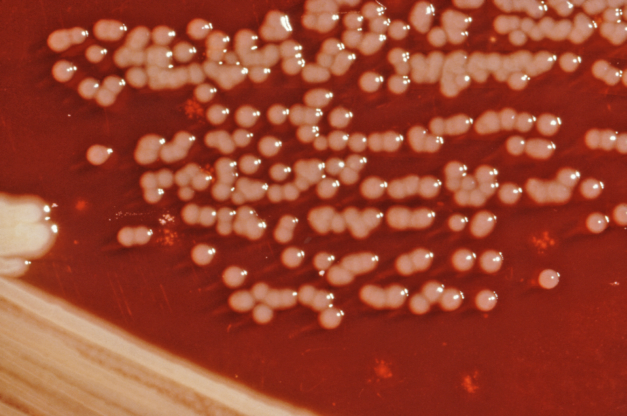
Yersinia enterocolitica colonies growing on XLD agar plates

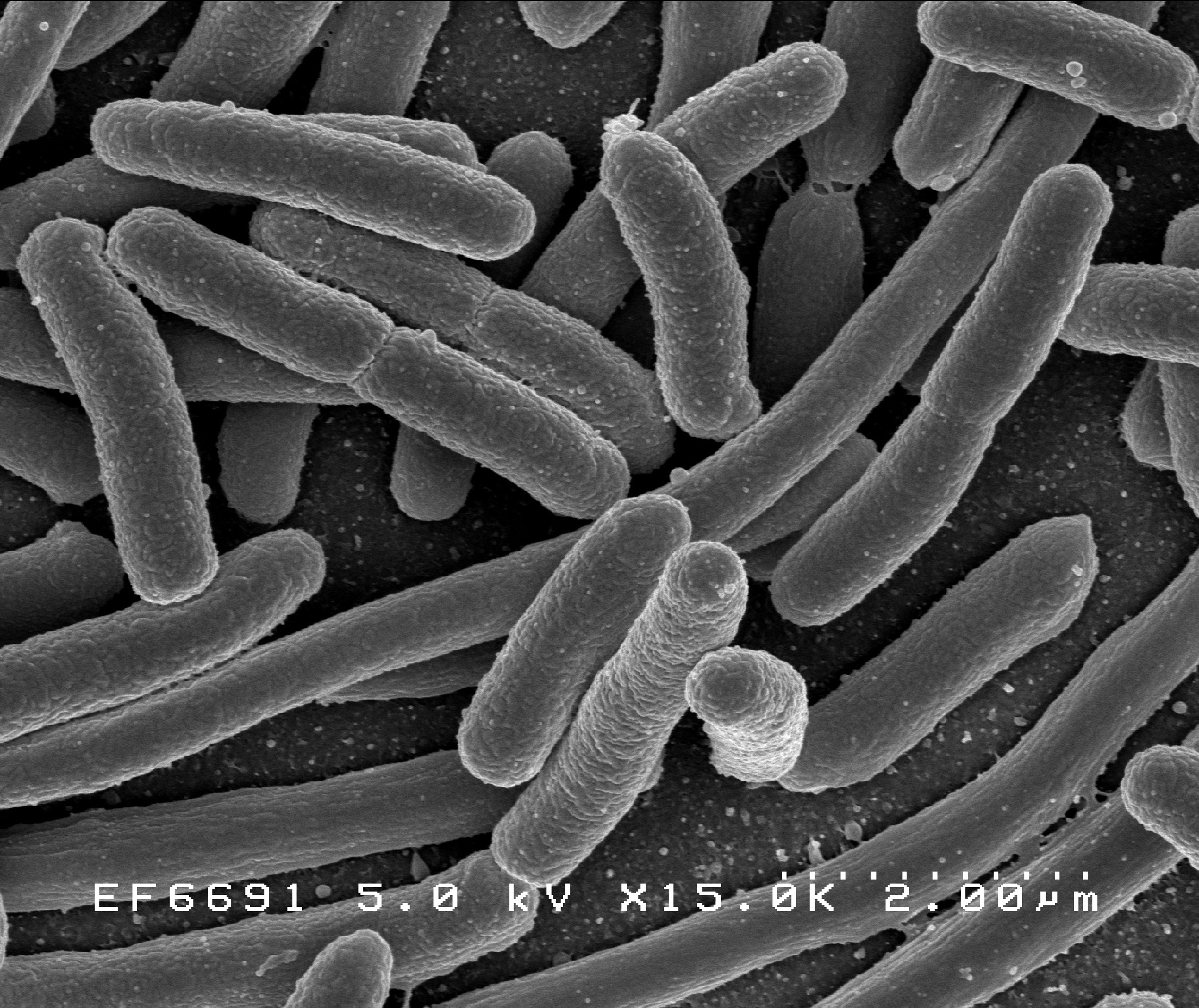
Escherichia coli

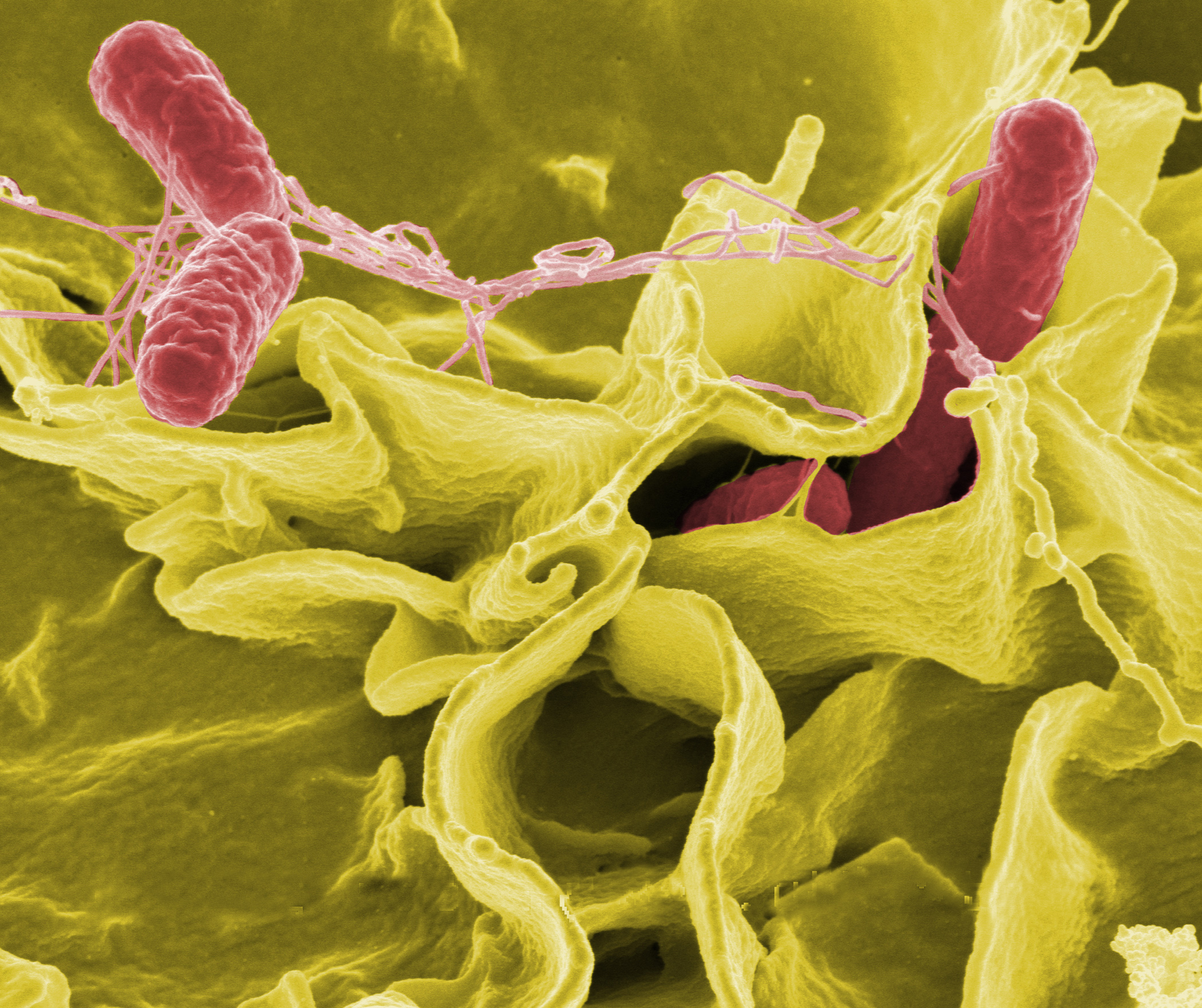
Color-enhanced scanning electron micrograph showing Salmonella typhimurium (red) invading cultured human cells

=== Spirals or helixes (spirochetes) ===
Spirochetes are usually spiral or corkscrew shaped and move using axial filament. Examples include Treponema pallidum and Leptospira borgpetersenii.

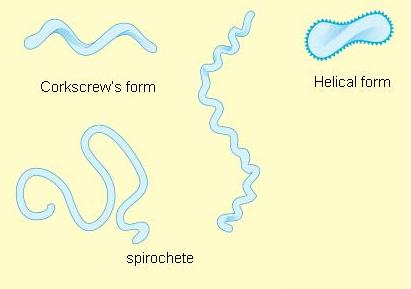
various forms of spirals

== Eye ==
Binomial Name	Phylum	Location	Pathogenicity	Frequency/Abundance
Chlamydia pneumoniae	Chlamydiota	Eye	Yes	
Chlamydia trachomatis	Chlamydiota	Eye	Yes	
Haemophilus aegyptius	Proteobacteria	Eye		
Haemophilus influenzae	Proteobacteria	Eye	Sometimes	
Moraxella spp	Proteobacteria	Eye	Sometimes	
Neisseria spp	Proteobacteria	Eye	Only N. gonorrheae and N. meningitidis	
Staphylococcus aureus	Firmicutes	Eye	Sometimes	
Staphylococcus epidermidis	Firmicutes	Eye		
Streptococcus viridans	Firmicutes	Eye		

== Mouth ==
The oral microbiota consists of all the microorganisms that exist in the mouth. It is the second largest of the human body and made of various bacteria, viruses, fungi and protozoa. These organisms play an important role in oral and overall health. Anthony Van Leeuwenhoek was the first to view these organisms using a microscope he created. The temperature and pH of saliva makes it conducive for bacteria to survive in the oral cavity. Bacteria in the oral cavity include Streptococcus mutans, Porphyromonas gingivalis, and Staphylococcus. S. mutans is the main component of the oral microbiota.

A healthy oral microbiome decreases oral infections and promotes a healthy gut microbiome. However, when disturbed, it can lead to gum inflammations and bad breath. Dental plaque is formed when oral microorganisms form biofilms on the surfaces of teeth. Recommended practices to maintain a healthy oral microbiome include practicing good oral hygiene (brushing twice and flossing, replacing toothbrush often), eating healthy diet (food with little or no added sugars and ultra processed foods), drinking lots of water and taking probiotics.

Binomial Name	Phylum	Location	Pathogenicity	Frequency/Abundance
Abiotrophia spp		Mouth		
Actinomyces spp	Actinomycetota	Mouth		
Actinomyces viscosus	Actinomycetota	Mouth		
Actinomyces naeslundii	Actinomycetota	Mouth		
Aggregatibacter actinomycetemcomitans		Mouth		
Arachnia propionica		Mouth		
Aspergillus spp	Ascomycota (fungi)	Mouth	Sometimes	
Atopobium spp	Actinomycetota	Mouth		
Aureobasidium spp	fungi	Mouth		
Bacterionema matruchotii (Corynebacterium matruchotii)	Actinomycetota	Gingiva		
Bacteroides spp	Bacteroidota	Mouth		
Bacteroides gingivalis	Bacteroidota	Mouth		
Bacteroides melaninogenicus	Bacteroidota	Mouth		
Bergeyella spp	Bacteroidota	Mouth		
Bifidobacterium spp	Actinomycetota	Mouth		
Buchnera aphidicola		Mouth		
Bulleidia spp	Firmicutes	Mouth		
Campylobacter spp	Campylobacterota	Mouth		
Candida spp	Ascomycota (fungi)	Mouth		
Candida albicans	Ascomycota (fungi)	Mouth	Sometimes	
Capnocytophaga spp	Bacteroidota	Mouth		
Cardiobacterium spp	Proteobacteria	Mouth		
Catonella spp	Firmicutes	Hard palate		
Citrobacter freundii		Throat		
Cladosporium spp	fungi	Mouth		
Corynebacterium spp	Actinomycetota	Mouth	Only C. diphtheriae	
Cryptococcus spp	fungi	Mouth		
Desulfobacter spp		Mouth		
Desulfovibrio spp		Mouth		
Dialister spp	Firmicutes	Mouth		
Eikenella corrodens	Proteobacteria	Mouth	Sometimes	
Entamoeba gingivalis	Amoebozoa (eukaryote)	Mouth		
Enterococcus spp	Firmicutes	Mouth	Sometimes	
Enterococcus faecium	Firmicutes	Mouth		
Eubacterium spp	Firmicutes	Mouth		
Fusarium spp	fungi	Mouth		
Fusobacterium spp	Fusobacteriota	Mouth		
Fusobacterium necrophorum	Fusobacteriota	Oropharynx		
Fusobacterium nucleatum	Fusobacteriota	Mouth	Sometimes	
Gemella spp	Firmicutes	Mouth		
Gordonia spp		Sputum		
Granulicatella spp	Firmicutes	Mouth		
Haemophilus spp	Proteobacteria	Mouth		
Kingella spp	Proteobacteria	Mouth		
Lactobacillus spp	Firmicutes	Mouth, Saliva	No	
Lautropia spp	Proteobacteria	Mouth		
Leptotrichia buccalis	Fusobacteriota	Mouth		
Methanobrevibacter oralis	Methanobacteriota (archaea)	Mouth		
Methanosarcina mazeii	Methanobacteriota (archaea)	Mouth		
Micrococcus spp		Mouth		
Mogibacterium spp	Firmicutes	Mouth		
Mycoplasma spp		Mouth		
Mycoplasma orale		Oropharynx		
Mycobacterium chelonae		Sputum		
Candidatus Nanosynbacter lyticus	Candidatus Saccaribacteria	Mouth		
Neisseria spp	Proteobacteria	Mouth	Only N. gonorrheae and N. meningitidis	
Oribacterium spp	Firmicutes	Mouth		
Parvimonas spp	Firmicutes	Mouth		
Peptococcus spp		Mouth		
Peptostreptococcus spp	Firmicutes	Mouth		
Phocoenobacter spp	Proteobacteria	Mouth		
Porphyromonas gingivalis	Bacteroidota	Mouth	Sometimes	
Prevotella spp	Bacteroidota	Mouth	Sometimes	
Propionibacterium spp	Actinomycetota	Mouth		
Pseudoramibacter spp		Mouth		
Rothia dentocariosa	Actinomycetota	Mouth	Occasionally	
Selenomonas spp	Firmicutes	Mouth		
Simonsiella spp		Mouth		
Staphylococcus aureus	Firmicutes	Mouth	Sometimes	
Staphylococcus epidermidis	Firmicutes	Mouth		
Streptococcus spp	Firmicutes	Mouth		
Streptococcus anginosus	Firmicutes	Oropharynx		
Streptococcus mitis	Firmicutes	Mouth		
Streptococcus mutans	Firmicutes	Teeth: dental plaque		
Streptococcus oralis	Firmicutes	Teeth: dental plaque		
Streptococcus sobrinus	Firmicutes	Teeth: dental plaque		
Streptococcus constellatus	Firmicutes	Oropharynx		
Streptococcus intermedius	Firmicutes	Oropharynx		
Tannerella forsythia	Bacteroidota	Mouth	Sometimes	
Torulopsis glabrata		Mouth		
Treponema denticola	Spirochetota	Mouth		
Trichomonas tenax	eukaryote	Mouth		
Veillonella spp	Firmicutes	Mouth		
Vibrio sputorum		Mouth		
Wolinella spp	Campylobacterota	Mouth		

== Respiratory System ==
Binomial Name	Phylum	Location	Pathogenicity	Frequency/Abundance
Acinetobacter spp		Nasopharynx		
Citrobacter freundii		Sputum		
Burkholderia cepacia complex	Proteobacteria	Lung		
Campylobacter sputorum		Nasopharynx		
Candida albicans	Ascomycota (fungi)	Pharynx		
Cardiobacterium spp		Nose		
Chlamydophila pneumoniae	Chlamydiota	Lung		
Fusobacterium spp	Fusobacteriota	Lung		
Haemophilus spp	Proteobacteria	Nasopharynx, lung		
Hemophilus influenzae	Proteobacteria	Mucous membranes	Sometimes	
Haemophilus parainfluenzae	Proteobacteria	Pharynx		
Haemophilus paraphrophilus	Proteobacteria	Pharynx		
Kingella spp	Proteobacteria	Upper respiratory tract		
Kingella kingae	Proteobacteria	Upper respiratory tract		
Moraxella spp	Proteobacteria	Nasopharynx		
Moraxella catarrhalis	Proteobacteria	Nasopharynx		
Mycoplasma pneumoniae		Respiratory epithelium		
Neisseria spp	Proteobacteria	Nasopharynx		
Neisseria cinerea	Proteobacteria	Nasopharynx		
Neisseria elongata	Proteobacteria	Pharynx		
Neisseria gonorrhoeae	Proteobacteria	Pharynx	Yes	
Neisseria lactamica	Proteobacteria	Nasopharynx		
Neisseria meningitidis	Proteobacteria	Nasopharynx	Yes	
Neisseria mucosa	Proteobacteria	Nasopharynx		
Neisseria sicca	Proteobacteria	Nasopharynx		
Peptococcus spp		Upper respiratory tract		
Peptostreptococcus spp	Firmicutes	Pharynx		
Pseudomonas spp	Proteobacteria	Lung		
Pseudomonas aeruginosa	Proteobacteria	Lung	Yes	
Selenomonas sputigena	Firmicutes	Nasopharynx		
Staphylococcus aureus	Firmicutes	Nose	Sometimes	
Streptobacillus spp		Throat, nasopharynx		
Streptococcus spp	Firmicutes	Lung		
Streptococcus pyogenes	Firmicutes	Upper respiratory tract		
Streptococcus pneumoniae	Firmicutes	Nasopharynx	Sometimes	

== Gastrointestinal Tract ==
Binomial Name	Phylum	Location	Pathogenicity	Frequency/Abundance
Achromobacter spp		Intestines		
Acidaminococcus fermentans	Firmicutes	Large intestine		
Acinetobacter calcoaceticus		Large intestine		
Actinomyces spp	Actinomycetota	Small and large intestine		
Adlercreutzia spp	Actinomycetota	Large intestine		
Aeromonas spp		Intestines		
Aflipia spp		GI tract		
Aggregatibacter spp		GI tract		
Akkermansia muciniphilia	Verrucomicrobia	Large intestine		
Alistripes spp		GI tract		
Alternaria spp	Ascomycota (fungi)	GI tract		
Anaerobiospirillum spp		Large intestine		
Anaerostipes spp		GI tract		
Anaerotruncus spp	Firmicutes	Large intestine		
Alcaligenes faecalis		Intestines		
Asaccharobacter spp		GI tract		
Aspergillus spp	Ascomycota (fungi)	GI tract	Sometimes	58.3%
Aspergillus versicolor	Ascomycota (fungi)	GI tract		5%
Asteroleplasma		GI tract		
Bacillus spp	Firmicutes	Large intestine		
Bacteroides spp	Bacteroidota	Esophagus, intestines		
Bacteroides fragilis	Bacteroidota	Large intestine		
Bacteroides melaninogenicus	Bacteroidota	Large intestine		
Barnesiella spp	Bacteroidota	GI tract		
Bifidobacterium spp	Actinomycetota	Large intestine	No	
Bifidobacterium longum	Actinomycetota	Large intestine		
Bilophilia wadsworthia	Proteobacteria	Large intestine		
Blautia spp	Firmicutes	Large intestine		
Brachybacterium spp		GI tract		
Butyricimonas spp		GI tract		
Butyrivibrio crossotus		Large intestine		
Campylobacter spp	Campylobacterota	Large intestine		
Candida spp	Ascomycota (fungi)	GI tract		2.5 - 59.7%
Candida albicans	Ascomycota (fungi)	GI tract		5.8 - 80.8%
Catenibacterium spp		GI tract		
Christensenella minuta	Firmicutes	GI tract		
Citrobacter spp	Proteobacteria	GI tract		
Clostridium spp	Firmicutes	Intestines		
Clostridium sordellii	Firmicutes	Stomach, small intestine, large intestine		
Collinsella aerofaciens	Actinomycetota	Large intestine		
Coprobacter spp		GI tract		
Coprobacillus spp		GI tract		
Coprococcus comes	Firmicutes	Large intestine		
Cladosporium cladosporoides	Ascomycota (fungi)	GI tract		
Cryptococcus spp	Basidomycota (fungi)	GI tract		4.7%
Debaryomyces spp	Ascomycota (fungi)	GI tract		
Desulfovibrio spp	Proteobacteria	Large intestine		
Dialister	Firmicutes	Large intestine		
Dorea spp	Firmicutes	Large intestine		
Eggerthella spp	Actinomycetota	Large intestine		
Escherichia coli	Proteobacteria	GI tract	Sometimes	
Enhydrobacter spp		GI tract		
Enterococcus spp	Firmicutes	Stomach, intestines	Sometimes	
Enterobacter spp	Proteobacteria	Large intestine		
Enterobacter cloacae	Proteobacteria	Large intestine		
Epulopiscium spp	Firmicutes	Large intestine		
Eubacterium spp	Firmicutes	Colon		
Exophiala spp	Ascomycota (fungi)	GI tract		
Faecalibacterium spp	Firmicutes	Large intestine		
Faecalibacterium prausnitzii	Firmicutes	Large intestine	No	
Ferrimonas spp	Proteobacteria	Intestines		
Flavobacterium spp		Intestines		
Fusobacterium spp	Fusobacteriota	Large intestine		
Galactomyces spp	Ascomycota (fungi)	GI tract		0.8 - 46%
Gemella spp	Firmicutes	Esophagus, intestines		
Geotrichium silvicola	Ascomycota (fungi)	GI tract		9.7%
Helicobacter pylori	Campylobacterota	Stomach	Yes	
Hemophilus spp	Proteobacteria	Intestines		
Holdemania spp		GI tract		
Holdemanella spp		GI tract		
Howardella spp		GI tract		
Hungatella spp		GI tract		
Intestinibacter bartlettii		GI tract		
Lachnobacterium spp	Firmicutes	Large intestine		
Lachnospira spp	Firmicutes	Intestines		
Lawsonibacter	Asaccharolyticus	GI tract		
Joetgalicoccus spp		GI tract		
Klesbiella spp	Proteobacteria	Intestines		
Kocuria spp		GI tract		
Lactobacillus spp	Firmicutes	Stomach, intestines		
Lactococcus lactis	Firmicutes	Intestines		
Leuconostoc spp		GI tract		
Malessezia spp	Basidomycota (fungi)	GI tract		88.3%
Megasphera	Firmicutes	Esophagus		
Mesorhizobium spp		GI tract		
Methanobrevibacter smithii	Methanobacteriota (archaea)	Intestines	No	
Methylobacterium spp		GI tract		
Microbacterium spp		GI tract		
Morganella morganii		Intestines		
Mycobacteria spp	Actinomycetota	Intestines		
Mycoplasma spp		Intestines		
Ochrobactrum spp		GI tract		
Oscillospira spp	Firmicutes	Large intestine		
Oxalobacter spp		GI tract		
Parabacteroides spp	Bacteroidota	Large intestine		
Paraprevotella	Bacteroidota	Large intestine		
Parasutterella spp		GI tract		
Pediococcus spp	Firmicutes	Intestines		
Pelomonas spp		GI tract		
Peptococcus spp		Large intestine		
Peptostreptococcus spp	Firmicutes	Colon		
Penicillium spp	Ascomycota (fungi)	GI tract		7 - 65.3%
Penicillium brevicompactum	Ascomycota (fungi)	GI tract		
Phascolarctobacterium		GI tract		
Pichia spp	Ascomycota (fungi)	GI tract		
Planomicrobium spp		GI tract		
Prevotella spp	Bacteroidota	Esophagus, stomach, intestines		
Propionibacterium spp	Actinomycetota	Large intestine		
Providencia spp		Large intestine		
Pseudochrobactrum spp		GI tract		
Pseudomonas spp	Proteobacteria	Esophagus		
Pseudomonas aeruginosa	Proteobacteria	Intestines	Sometimes	
Porphyromonas spp		Large intestine		
Pyramidobacter spp		GI tract		
Rheinheimera spp		GI tract		
Rhodoturula spp	Basidiomycota (fungi)	GI tract		7 - 15.3%
Rhomboutsia spp		GI tract		
Roseburia spp	Firmicutes	Large intestine		
Rothia spp	Actinomycetota	Esophagus		
Ruminococcus spp	Firmicutes	Large intestine		
Ruminococcus gnavus	Firmicutes	Large intestine		
Rummeliibacillus spp	Firmicutes	Intestines		
Saccharomyces spp	Ascomycota (fungi)	GI tract		1.1 - 100%
Saccharomyces cerevisiae	Ascomycota (fungi)	GI tract		
Sarcina spp		Large intestine		
Sellimonas spp		GI tract		
Senegalimassilia spp		GI tract		
Serratia spp		GI tract		
Slackia spp		GI tract		
Sphingobacterium spiritivorum		GI tract		
Sphingomonas spp		GI tract		
Streptococcus spp	Firmicutes	Esophagus, stomach, intestines		
Streptococcus anginosus	Firmicutes	GI tract		
Subdoligranulum spp		GI tract		
Succinatomonas spp		GI tract		
Succinovibrio spp		GI tract		
Sutterella spp	Proteobacteria	Large intestine		
Taonella spp		GI tract		
Trabulsiella spp	Proteobacteria	Intestines		
Trichosporon spp	Basidiomycota (fungi)	GI tract		30.6%
Tsukamurella spp		GI tract		
Turicibacter spp	Firmicutes	Intestines		
Veillonella spp	Firmicutes	Esophagus, intestines		
Vibrio spp		Intestines		
Weissella spp		GI tract		
Yersinia enterocolitica		Large intestine		

== Skin ==
Binomial Name	Phylum	Location	Pathogenicity	Frequency/Abundance
Acinetobacter spp		Skin		
Bacillus spp	Firmicutes	Skin		
Candida albicans	Ascomycota (fungi)	Skin		
Candida parapsilosis	Ascomycota (fungi)	Skin		
Corynebacterium spp	Actinomycetota	Skin		
Corynebacterium parvum	Actinomycetota	Skin		
Cutibacterium acnes	Actinomycetota	Skin		
Demodex folliculorum		Skin		
Enterobacter cloacae		Skin		
Epidermophyton floccosum		Skin		
Malassezia ovale		Skin		
Micrococcus luteus		Skin		
Micrococcus spp		Skin		
Mycobacterium spp	Actinomycetota	Skin		
Neisseria spp	Proteobacteria	Skin		
Peptostreptococcus spp	Firmicutes	Skin		
Propionibacterium spp	Actinomycetota	Skin		
Pseudomonas aeruginosa	Proteobacteria	Skin	Mostly	
Sarcina spp		Skin		
Staphylococcus aureus	Firmicutes	Skin	Sometimes	
Staphylococcus epidermidis	Firmicutes	Skin	Sometimes, mostly not	
Staphylococcus haemolyticus	Firmicutes	Skin		
Streptococcus viridans	Firmicutes	Skin		
Trichophyton spp		Skin		

== Female Reproductive Tract ==
The vaginal microbiota is shaped by puberty, pregnancy and menopause. Vaginal microbiota including some Lactobacillus species protect the vagina from harmful pathogens. They convert glucose to lactic acid and this acidic environment kills harmful pathogens. The vaginal microbiota in pregnancy varies markedly during the entire time of gestation. The species and diversity of the

microorganisms may be related to the various levels of hormones during pregnancy. Vaginal flora can be transmitted to babies during birth. Vaginal dysbiosis can lead to vaginal infections like bacterial vaginosis which makes one relatively susceptible to sexually transmitted diseases. Good personal hygiene and probiotics may promote a healthy vaginal microbiota.

The healthy uterine microbiome has been identified and over 278 genera have been sequenced. Bacteria species like Fusobacterium are typically found in the uterus. Although Lactobacillus may be beneficial in the vagina, "increased levels in the uterus through a breach in the cervical barrier" may be harmful to the uterus.

The ovarian follicle microbiome has been studied using standard culturing techniques. It has been associated with the outcomes of assisted reproductive technologies and birth outcomes. Positive outcomes are related to the presence of Lactobacillus spp while the presence of Propionibacterium and Actinomyces were related to negative outcomes. The microbiome can vary from one ovary to the other. Studies are ongoing in the further identification of those bacteria present.

Binomial Name	Phylum	Location	Pathogenicity	Frequency/Abundance
Acinetobacter spp		Anterior urethra		
Bacteroides spp	Bacteroidota	External genitalia		
Candida albicans	Ascomycota (fungi)	Anterior urethra, external genitalia	Sometimes	
Enterobacteriaceae		Anterior urethra, external genitalia		
Gardnerella vaginalis		Vagina		
Lactobacillus spp.	Firmicutes	Vagina		
Mycoplasma hominis		Vagina		
Prevotella spp.	Bacteroidota	Vagina		
Streptococcus viridans	Firmicutes	Anterior urethra, external genitalia		

== Male reproductive tract ==
The microbiome present in seminal fluid has been evaluated. Using traditional culturing techniques the microbiome differs between men who have acute prostatitis and those who have chronic prostatitis. Identification of the seminal fluid microbiome has become one of the diagnostic tools used in treating infertility in men that do not display symptoms of infection or disease. The taxa Pseudomonas, Lactobacillus, and Prevotella display a negative effect on the quality of sperm. The presence of Lactobacillus spp in semen samples is associated with a very high normal sperm count.

Binomial Name	Phylum	Location	Pathogenicity	Frequency/Abundance
Acinetobacter spp		Anterior urethra		
Bacteroides spp	Bacteroidota	External genitalia		
Candida albicans	Ascomycota (fungi)	Anterior urethra, external genitalia	Sometimes	
Enterobacteriaceae		Anterior urethra, external genitalia		
Streptococcus viridans	Firmicutes	Anterior urethra, external genitalia		

== See also ==
- Placental microbiome
- List of bacterial vaginosis microbiota
- List of microbiota species of the lower reproductive tract of women
- Lung microbiota
- Gut microbiota
- Skin flora
- https://www.wikidata.org/wiki/Q1591401

== Other lists of the human body's contents and building bricks ==
- List of skeletal muscles of the human body
- List of organs of the human body
- List of distinct cell types in the adult human body
