= List of restriction enzyme cutting sites: L–N =

Legend of nucleobases
Code	Nucleotide represented
A	Adenine (A)
C	Cytosine (C)
G	Guanine (G)
T	Thymine (T)
N	A, C, G or T
M	A or C
R	A or G
W	A or T
Y	C or T
S	C or G
K	G or T
H	A, C or T
B	C, G or T
V	A, C or G
D	A, G or T

This article contains a list of the most studied restriction enzymes whose names start with L to N inclusive. It contains approximately 120 enzymes.

The following information is given:

- Enzyme: Accepted name of the molecule, according to the internationally adopted nomenclature, and bibliographical references. (Further reading: see the section "Nomenclature" in the article "Restriction enzyme".)
- PDB code: Code used to identify the structure of a protein in the PDB database of protein structures. The 3D atomic structure of a protein provides highly valuable information to understand the intimate details of its mechanism of action.
- Source: Organism that naturally produces the enzyme.
- Recognition sequence: Sequence of DNA recognized by the enzyme and to which it specifically binds.
- Cut: Cutting site and DNA products of the cut. The recognition sequence and the cutting site usually match, but sometimes the cutting site can be dozens of nucleotides away from the recognition site.
- Isoschizomers and neoschizomers: An isoschizomer is an enzyme that recognizes the same sequence as another. A neoschizomer is a special type of isoschizomer that recognizes the same sequence as another, but cuts in a different manner. A maximum number of 8-10 most common isoschizomers are indicated for every enzyme but there may be many more. Neoschizomers are shown in bold and green color font (e.g.: **BamHI**). When "None on date" is indicated, that means that there were no registered isoschizomers in the databases on that date with a clearly defined cutting site. Isoschizomers indicated in white font and grey background correspond to enzymes not listed in the current lists:

as in this not listed enzyme:	EcoR70I

== Restriction enzymes ==
=== L ===
**Enzyme**	**PDB code**	Source	**Recognition sequence**	**Cut**	**Isoschizomers**
LcaI		Lactobacillus casei	5' ATCGAT; 3' TAGCTA	5' ---AT CGAT--- 3'; 3' ---TAGC TA--- 5'	BdiI, Bli41I, Bsa29I, BscI, Bsp106I, BspDI, Bst28I, LplI, PgaI, ZhoI
LlaAI		Lactococcus lactis cremoris W9	5' GATC; 3' CTAG	5' --- GATC--- 3'; 3' ---CTAG --- 5'	Bme12I, Bsp67I, BstENII, **ChaI**, FnuEI, MgoI, NphI, RalF40I
LlaBI		Lactococcus lactis cremoris W56	5' CTRYAG; 3' GAYRTC	5' ---C TRYAG--- 3'; 3' ---GAYRT C--- 5'
LlaCI		Lactococcus lactis W15	5' AAGCTT; 3' TTCGAA	5' ---A AGCTT--- 3'; 3' ---TTCGA A--- 5'
LlaG2I		Lactococcus lactis cremoris	5' GCTAGC; 3' CGATCG	5' ---G CTAGC--- 3'; 3' ---CGATC G--- 5'	**AceII**, AsuNHI, **BmtI**, / **BspOI**, NheI, PstNHI
Lmu60I		Listeria murrayi 60	5' CCTNAGG; 3' GGANTCC	5' ---CC TNAGG--- 3'; 3' ---GGANT CC--- 5'	AocI, AxyI, BspR7I, CvnI, Lmu60I, MstII, SauI, SshAI
LplI		Lactobacillus plantarum	5' ATCGAT; 3' TAGCTA	5' ---AT CGAT--- 3'; 3' ---TAGC TA--- 5'	BanIII, BbvAII, BdiI, Bsa29I, BscI, BstNZ169I, ClaI, LcaI, PgaI
LpnI		Legionella pneumophila	5' RGCGCY; 3' YCGCGR	5' ---RGC GCY--- 3'; 3' ---YCG CGR--- 5'	**AccB2I**, / **BfoI**, / Bme142I, **Bsp143II**, **BstH2I**, **HaeII**
LspI		Lactobacillus sp.	5' TTCGAA; 3' AAGCTT	5' ---TT CGAA--- 3'; 3' ---AAGC TT--- 5'	Asp10HI, BimI, BsiCI, BstBI, Csp45I, PlaII, PpaAI, Ssp1I
LweI		Listeria welshimeri RFL131	5' GCATC; 3' CGTAG	5' ---GCATCN_{4}N NNNN--- 3'; 3' ---CGTAGN_{4}NNNNN --- 5'

=== M ===
**Enzyme**	**PDB code**	Source	**Recognition sequence**	**Cut**	**Isoschizomers**
MabI		Microbacterium arborescens SE	5' ACCWGGT; 3' TGGWCCA	5' ---A CCWGGT--- 3'; 3' ---TGGWCC A--- 5'
MaeI		Methanococcus aeolicus PL-15/H	5' CTAG; 3' GATC	5' ---C TAG--- 3'; 3' ---GAT C--- 5'
MaeII		Methanococcus aeolicus	5' ACGT; 3' TGCA	5' ---A CGT--- 3'; 3' ---TGC A--- 5'
MaeIII		Methanococcus aeolicus	5' GTNAC; 3' CANTG	5' --- GTNAC--- 3'; 3' ---CANTG --- 5'
MaeK81I		Microcystis aeruginosa K-81	5' CGTACG; 3' GCATGC	5' ---C GTACG--- 3'; 3' ---GCATG C--- 5'
MaeK81II		Microcystis aeruginosa	5' GGNCC; 3' CCNGG	5' ---G GNCC--- 3'; 3' ---CCNG G--- 5'	AsuI, Bal228I, Bce22I, BsiZI, BspF4I, Cfr13I, Nsp7121I, Sau96I
MamI		Microbacterium ammoniaphilum	5' GATN_{4}ATC; 3' CTAN_{4}TAG	5' ---GATNN NNATC--- 3'; 3' ---CTANN NNTAG--- 5'
MavI		Mycobacterium avium	5' CTCGAG; 3' GAGCTC	5' ---C TCGAG--- 3'; 3' ---GAGCT C--- 5'	BspAAI, BstVI, MlaAI, PaeR7I, SauLPII, **SciI**, SlaI, Sol10179I, XhoI
MbiI		Moraxella bovis Fr1-022	5' CCGCTC; 3' GGCGAG	5' ---CCG CTC--- 3'; 3' ---GGC GAG--- 5'	AccBSI, BsrBI, BstD102I, Bst31NI
MboI		Moraxella bovis	5' GATC; 3' CTAG	5' --- GATC--- 3'; 3' ---CTAG --- 5'	AspMDI, Bsp105I, BspFI, BstMBI, CviAI, Kzo9I, NdeII, Sth368I
MboII		Moraxella bovis	5' GAAGA; 3' CTTCT	5' ---GAAGAN_{6}NN --- 3'; 3' ---CTTCTN_{6}N N--- 5'
MchI		Micromonospora chalcea	5' GGCGCC; 3' CCGCGG	5' ---GG CGCC--- 3'; 3' ---CCGC GG--- 5'
MchAI		Mycobacterium chelonae	5' GCGGCCGC; 3' CGCCGGCG	5' ---GC GGCCGC--- 3'; 3' ---CGCCGG CG--- 5'
MchAII		Mycobacterium chelonae	5' GGCC; 3' CCGG	5' ---GG CC--- 3'; 3' ---CC GG--- 5'
McrI		Micrococcus cryophilus	5' CGRYCG; 3' GCYRGC	5' ---CGRY CG--- 3'; 3' ---GC YRGC--- 5'
MfeI		Mycoplasma fermentans	5' CAATTG; 3' GTTAAC	5' ---C AATTG--- 3'; 3' ---GTTAA C--- 5'
MflI		Microbacterium flavum	5' RGATCY; 3' YCTAGR	5' ---R GATCY--- 3'; 3' ---YCTAG R--- 5'
MfoAI		Mycobacterium fortuitum TMC 1529	5' GGCC; 3' CCGG	5' ---GG CC--- 3'; 3' ---CC GG--- 5'
Mgl14481I		Merismopedia glauca 1448-1	5' CCSGG; 3' GGSCC	5' ---CC SGG--- 3'; 3' ---GGS CC--- 5'	AseII, AsuC2I, BcnI, BpuMI, CauII, **Eco1831I**, **EcoHI**, HgiS22I, NciI
MgoI		Mycobacterium gordonae	5' GATC; 3' CTAG	5' --- GATC--- 3'; 3' ---CTAG --- 5'	AspMDI, BspAI, BstENII, **ChaI**, FnuEI, MkrAI, NphI, Sau3AI
MhaAI		Mycobacterium habana 206	5' CTGCAG; 3' GACGTC	5' ---CTGCA G--- 3'; 3' ---G ACGTC--- 5'	AliAJI, Asp713I, Bsp63I, CstI, Ecl37kI, HalII, PaePI, PstI, YenI
MhlI		Micrococcus halobius SD	5' GDGCHC; 3' CHCGDG	5' ---GDGCH C--- 3'; 3' ---C HCGDG--- 5'	AocII, BmyI, BsoCI, Bsp1286I, BspLS2I, MhlI, SduI
MkrAI		Micrococcus kristinae	5' GATC; 3' CTAG	5' --- GATC--- 3'; 3' ---CTAG --- 5'	Bme12I, BspAI, BstENII, **ChaI**, FnuEI, MgoI, NphI, Sau3AI
MlaI		Mastigocladus laminosus	5' TTCGAA; 3' AAGCTT	5' ---TT CGAA--- 3'; 3' ---AAGC TT--- 5'	Asp10HI, BimI, BsiCI, BstBI, Csp68KII, LspI, PlaII, Ssp1I
MlaAI		Micromonospora lacustris	5' CTCGAG; 3' GAGCTC	5' ---C TCGAG--- 3'; 3' ---GAGCT C--- 5'	BspAAI, BstVI, PanI, SauLPII, Sbi68I, Sfr274I, SlaI, XhoI
MlsI		Micrococcus luteus Ng 16-122	5' TGGCCA; 3' ACCGGT	5' ---TGG CCA--- 3'; 3' ---ACC GGT--- 5'
MltI		Micrococcus luteus	5' AGCT; 3' TCGA	5' ---AG CT--- 3'; 3' ---TC GA--- 5'	AluBI, AluI
MluI		Micrococcus luteus	5' ACGCGT; 3' TGCGCA	5' ---A CGCGT--- 3'; 3' ---TGCGC A--- 5'
Mlu23I		Micrococcus luteus 23	5' GGATCC; 3' CCTAGG	5' ---G GATCC--- 3'; 3' ---CCTAG G--- 5'
Mlu31I		Micrococcus luteus 31	5' TGGCCA; 3' ACCGGT	5' ---TGG CCA--- 3'; 3' ---ACC GGT--- 5'
MluB2I		Micrococcus luteus B2	5' TCGCGA; 3' AGCGCT	5' ---TCG CGA--- 3'; 3' ---AGC GCT--- 5'
MluNI		Micrococcus luteus N	5' TGGCCA; 3' ACCGGT	5' ---TGG CCA--- 3'; 3' ---ACC GGT--- 5'
MlyI		Micrococcus lylae	5' GAGTC; 3' CTCAG	5' ---GAGTCN_{4}N --- 3'; 3' ---CTCAGN_{4}N --- 5'
Mly113I		Micrococcus lylae 113	5' GGCGCC; 3' CCGCGG	5' ---GG CGCC--- 3'; 3' ---CCGC GG--- 5'
MmeI		Methylophilus methylotrophus	5' TCCRAC; 3' AGGYTG	5' ---TCCRACN_{17}NNN --- 3'; 3' ---AGGYTGN_{17}N NN--- 5'
MnlI		Moraxella nonliquefaciens	5' CCTC; 3' GGAG	5' ---CCTCN_{4}NNN --- 3'; 3' ---GGAGN_{4}NN N--- 5'
MnoI		Moraxella nonliquefaciens	5' CCGG; 3' GGCC	5' ---C CGG--- 3'; 3' ---GGC C--- 5'
Mph1103I		Moraxella phenylpyruvica RFL1103	5' ATGCAT; 3' TACGTA	5' ---ATGCA T--- 3'; 3' ---T ACGTA--- 5'	BfrBI, Csp68KIII, EcoT22I, NsiI, PinBI, Ppu10I, SepI, SspD5II
MroI		Micrococcus roseus	5' TCCGGA; 3' AGGCCT	5' ---T CCGGA--- 3'; 3' ---AGGCC T--- 5'	BbvAIII, BseAI, Bsp13I, BspEI, Bsu23I, CauB3I, PinBII, PtaI
MroNI		Micrococcus roseus N	5' GCCGGC; 3' CGGCCG	5' ---G CCGGC--- 3'; 3' ---CGGCC G--- 5'
MroXI		Micrococcus roseus XM	5' GAAN_{4}TTC; 3' CTTN_{4}AAG	5' ---GAANN NNTTC--- 3'; 3' ---CTTNN NNAAG--- 5'	Asp700I, BbvAI, PdmI, XmnI
MscI		Micrococcus sp.	5' TGGCCA; 3' ACCGGT	5' ---TGG CCA--- 3'; 3' ---ACC GGT--- 5'
MseI		Micrococcus sp.	5' TTAA; 3' AATT	5' ---T TAA--- 3'; 3' ---AAT T--- 5'
MslI		Moraxella osloensis	5' CAYN_{4}RTG; 3' GTRN_{4}YAC	5' ---CAYNN NNRTG--- 3'; 3' ---GTRNN NNYAC--- 5'
MspI	1SA3, 1YFI, Search PDBe	Moraxella sp.	5' CCGG; 3' GGCC	5' ---C CGG--- 3'; 3' ---GGC C--- 5'
Msp17I		Micrococcus sp. 17	5' GRCGYC; 3' CYGCRG	5' ---GR CGYC--- 3'; 3' ---CYGC RG--- 5'	AsuIII, BsaHI, BstACI, HgiGI, HgiHII, Hin1I, Msp17I, PamII
Msp20I		Micrococcus sp.	5' TGGCCA; 3' ACCGGT	5' ---TGG CCA--- 3'; 3' ---ACC GGT--- 5'
Msp67I		Micrococcus sp. MS67	5' CCNGG; 3' GGNCC	5' ---CC NGG--- 3'; 3' ---GGN CC--- 5'
MspA1I		Moraxella sp. A1	5' CMGCKG; 3' GKCGMC	5' ---CMG CKG--- 3'; 3' ---GKC GMC--- 5'
MspB4I		Moraxella sp. B4	5' GGYRCC; 3' CCRYGG	5' ---G GYRCC--- 3'; 3' ---CCRYG G--- 5'	AccB1I, BanI, BshNI, BspT107I, Eco64I, HgiCI, HgiHI, PfaAI
MspCI		Micrococcus sp.	5' CTTAAG; 3' GAATTC	5' ---C TTAAG--- 3'; 3' ---GAATT C--- 5'
MspR9I		Micrococcus sp. R9	5' CCNGG; 3' GGNCC	5' ---CC NGG--- 3'; 3' ---GGN CC--- 5'
MspSWI		Moraxella sp. SW	5' ATTTAAAT; 3' TAAATTTA	5' ---ATTT AAAT--- 3'; 3' ---TAAA TTTA--- 5'
MspV281I		Myxosarcinia sp. V/281	5' GWGCWC; 3' CWCGWG	5' ---GWGCW C--- 3'; 3' ---C WCGWG--- 5'	Alw21I, AspHI, Bbv12I, Bsh45I, BsiHKAI, Bsm6I, / HgiAI, / HpyF46II,
MspYI		Microcystis sp. J2	5' YACGTR; 3' RTGCAY	5' ---YAC GTR--- 3'; 3' ---RTG CAY--- 5'
MssI		Methylobacterium sp. Dd 5-732	5' GTTTAAAC; 3' CAAATTTG	5' ---GTTT AAAC--- 3'; 3' ---CAAA TTTG--- 5'	PmeI
MstI		Microcoleus sp.	5' TGCGCA; 3' ACGCGT	5' ---TGC GCA--- 3'; 3' ---ACG CGT--- 5'	Acc16I, AosI, AviII, FdiII, FspI, NsbI, PamI, Pun14627I
MstII		Microcoleus sp.	5' CCTNAGG; 3' GGANTCC	5' ---CC TNAGG--- 3'; 3' ---GGANT CC--- 5'	AocI, BliHKI, BspR7I, CvnI, Lmu60I, OxaNI, SauI, SshAI
MthZI		Methanobacterium thermoformicicum Z-245	5' CTAG; 3' GATC	5' ---C TAG--- 3'; 3' ---GAT C--- 5'
MunI	1D02	Mycoplasma sp.	5' CAATTG; 3' GTTAAC	5' ---C AATTG--- 3'; 3' ---GTTAA C--- 5'
MvaI	2OAA, 2OA9, Search PDBe, 2OA9	Micrococcus varians RFL19	5' CCWGG; 3' GGWCC	5' ---CC WGG--- 3'; 3' ---GGW CC--- 5'	**AjnI**, BciBII, BptI, Bst1I, BstOI, BstM6I, Bst2UI, SslI, TaqXI, ZanI
Mva1269I		Micrococcus varians RFL1269	5' GAATGC; 3' CTTACG	5' ---GAATGCN --- 3'; 3' ---CTTAC GN--- 5'	Asp26HI, Asp40HI, Asp50HI, BscCI, BsmI, Mva1269I, PctI
MvnI		Methanococcus vannielii	5' CGCG; 3' GCGC	5' ---CG CG--- 3'; 3' ---GC GC--- 5'	AccII, Bsh1236I, BstFNI, BtkI, Csp68KVI, FalII, FauBII, ThaI
MvrI		Micrococcus varians	5' CGATCG; 3' GCTAGC	5' ---CGAT CG--- 3'; 3' ---GC TAGC--- 5'	Afa22MI, BspCI, EagBI, ErhB9I, Ple19I, PvuI, RshI, XorII
MwoI		Methanobacterium wolfei	5' GCN_{7}GC; 3' CGN_{7}CG	5' ---GCNNNNN NNGC--- 3'; 3' ---CGNN NNNNNCG--- 5'
MxaI		Myxococcus xanthus F18E	5' GAGCTC; 3' CTCGAG	5' ---GAG CTC--- 3'; 3' ---CTC GAG--- 5'

=== N ===
**Enzyme**	**PDB code**	Source	**Recognition sequence**	**Cut**	**Isoschizomers**
NaeI	1EV7, 1iaw, Search PDB	Nocardia aerocolonigenes	5' GCCGGC; 3' CGGCCG	5' ---GCC GGC--- 3'; 3' ---CGG CCG--- 5'
NarI		Nocardia argentinensis	5' GGCGCC; 3' CCGCGG	5' ---GG CGCC--- 3'; 3' ---CCGC GG--- 5'
NblI		Nocardia blackwellii	5' CGATCG; 3' GCTAGC	5' ---CGAT CG--- 3'; 3' ---GC TAGC--- 5'	Afa16RI, Afa22MI, EagBI, MvrI, Ple19I, Psu161I, RshI, XorII
NciI		Neisseria cinerea	5' CCSGG; 3' GGSCC	5' ---CC SGG--- 3'; 3' ---GGS CC--- 5'	AhaI, AseII, AsuC2I, / BpuMI, CauII, **EcoHI**, HgiS22I, Mgl14481I
NcoI		Nocardia corallina	5' CCATGG; 3' GGTACC	5' ---C CATGG--- 3'; 3' ---GGTAC C--- 5'
NcrI		Nocardia carnea C-212	5' AGATCT; 3' TCTAGA	5' ---A GATCT--- 3'; 3' ---TCTAG A--- 5'
NcuI		Neisseria cuniculi	5' GAAGA; 3' CTTCT	5' ---GAAGAN_{6}NN --- 3'; 3' ---CTTCTN_{6}N N--- 5'
NdaI		Nocardia dassonvillei	5' GGCGCC; 3' CCGCGG	5' ---GG CGCC--- 3'; 3' ---CCGC GG--- 5'
NdeI		Neisseria denitrificans	5' CATATG; 3' GTATAC	5' ---CA TATG--- 3'; 3' ---GTAT AC--- 5'
NdeII		Neisseria denitrificans	5' GATC; 3' CTAG	5' --- GATC--- 3'; 3' ---CTAG --- 5'	Bce243I, Bsp105I, BspJI, BstMBI, CviAI, Kzo9I, NlaII, Sth368I
NgoAIII		Neisseria gonorrhoeae FA1090	5' CCGCGG; 3' GGCGCC	5' ---CCGC GG--- 3'; 3' ---GG CGCC--- 5'
NgoAIV		Neisseria gonorrhoeae FA1090	5' GCCGGC; 3' CGGCCG	5' ---G CCGGC--- 3'; 3' ---CGGCC G--- 5'
NgoMIV	1FIU, 4abt Search PDBe θ	Neisseria gonorrhoeae MS11	5' GCCGGC; 3' CGGCCG	5' ---G CCGGC--- 3'; 3' ---CGGCC G--- 5'
NgoPII		Neisseria gonorrhoeae P9-2	5' GGCC; 3' CCGG	5' ---GG CC--- 3'; 3' ---CC GG--- 5'
NgoPIII		Neisseria gonorrhoeae P9-2	5' CCGCGG; 3' GGCGCC	5' ---CCGC GG--- 3'; 3' ---GG CGCC--- 5'
NheI		Neisseria mucosa heidelbergensis	5' GCTAGC; 3' CGATCG	5' ---G CTAGC--- 3'; 3' ---CGATC G--- 5'	**AceII**, AsuNHI, **BmtI**, / **BspOI**, LlaG2I, PstNHI
NlaII		Neisseria lactamica	5' GATC; 3' CTAG	5' --- GATC--- 3'; 3' ---CTAG --- 5'	BscFI, BspAI, BstENII, **ChaI**, FnuEI, MgoI, RalF40I, Sau3AI
NlaIII		Neisseria lactamica	5' CATG; 3' GTAC	5' ---CATG --- 3'; 3' --- GTAC--- 5'
NlaIV		Neisseria lactamica	5' GGNNCC; 3' CCNNGG	5' ---GGN NCC--- 3'; 3' ---CCN NGG--- 5'	AspNI, BscBI, / BmiI, / BspLI, PspN4I
Nli3877I		Nostoc linckia	5' CYCGRG; 3' GRGCYC	5' ---CYCGR G--- 3'; 3' ---G RGCYC--- 5'	**Ama87I**, **AvaI**, **BcoI**, **BsiHKCI**, **Eco27kI**, **Eco88I**, **NspSAI**, **OfoI**
NmeCI		Neisseria meningitidis C114	5' GATC; 3' CTAG	5' --- GATC--- 3'; 3' ---CTAG --- 5'	BscFI, BspAI, BstENII, **ChaI**, FnuEI, MgoI, RalF40I, Sau3AI
NmeRI		Neisseria meningitidis	5' CAGCTG; 3' GTCGAC	5' ---CAG CTG--- 3'; 3' ---GTC GAC--- 5'
NmuCI		Neisseria mucosa C9-2	5' GTSAC; 3' CASTG	5' --- GTSAC--- 3'; 3' ---CASTG --- 5'
NopI		Nocardia opaca	5' GTCGAC; 3' CAGCTG	5' ---G TCGAC--- 3'; 3' ---CAGCT G--- 5'
NotI	3C25, 3BVQ, Search PDBe	Nocardia otitidis-caviarum	5' GCGGCCGC; 3' CGCCGGCG	5' ---GC GGCCGC--- 3'; 3' ---CGCCGG CG--- 5'
NphI		Neisseria pharyngis C245	5' GATC; 3' CTAG	5' --- GATC--- 3'; 3' ---CTAG --- 5'	AspMDI, BspAI, BstENII, **ChaI**, FnuEI, MkrAI, RalF40I, Sau3AI
NruI		Nocardia rubra	5' TCGCGA; 3' AGCGCT	5' ---TCG CGA--- 3'; 3' ---AGC GCT--- 5'
NruGI		Nocardia sp. G	5' GACN_{5}GTC; 3' CTGN_{5}CAG	5' ---GACNNN NNGTC--- 3'; 3' ---CTGNN NNNCAG--- 5'	AhdI, AspEI, / BmeRI, / BspOVI, DriI, Eam1105I, EclHKI
NsbI		Neisseria subflava Va-1	5' TGCGCA; 3' ACGCGT	5' ---TGC GCA--- 3'; 3' ---ACG CGT--- 5'	Acc16I, AosI, AviII, FdiII, FspI, MstI, PamI, Pun14627I
NsiI		Neisseria sicca	5' ATGCAT; 3' TACGTA	5' ---ATGCA T--- 3'; 3' ---T ACGTA--- 5'	BfrBI, Csp68KIII, EcoT22I, PinBI, Ppu10I, SepI, SspD5II, Zsp2I
NsiCI		Neisseria sicca C351	5' GATATC; 3' CTATAG	5' ---GAT ATC--- 3'; 3' ---CTA TAG--- 5'
NspI		Nostoc sp. C	5' RCATGY; 3' YGTACR	5' ---RCATG Y--- 3'; 3' ---Y GTACR--- 5'
NspII		Nostoc sp. C	5' GDGCHC; 3' CHCGDG	5' ---GDGCH C--- 3'; 3' ---C HCGDG--- 5'	AocII, BmyI, BsoCI, Bsp1286I, MhlI, NspII, SduI
NspIII		Nostoc sp. C	5' CYCGRG; 3' GRGCYC	5' ---C YCGRG--- 3'; 3' ---GRGCY C--- 5'	Ama87I, AvaI, Bse15I, BsoBI, Eco27kI, Eco88I, OfoI, PunAI
NspIV		Nostoc sp. C	5' GGNCC; 3' CCNGG	5' ---G GNCC--- 3'; 3' ---CCNG G--- 5'	AvcI, Bal228I, Bce22I, BsiZI, BspF4I, Cfr13I, Nsp7121I, **UnbI**
NspV		Nostoc sp. C	5' TTCGAA; 3' AAGCTT	5' ---TT CGAA--- 3'; 3' ---AAGC TT--- 5'	Asp10HI, BimI, Bsp119I, BstBI, Csp68KII, MlaI, PlaII, SspRFI
Nsp7121I		Nostoc sp. 7121	5' GGNCC; 3' CCNGG	5' ---G GNCC--- 3'; 3' ---CCNG G--- 5'	AvcI, Bal228I, Bce22I, Bsp1894I, Bsu54I, Cfr13I, NspIV, **UnbI**
Nsp29132II		Nostoc sp.	5' GGATCC; 3' CCTAGG	5' ---G GATCC--- 3'; 3' ---CCTAG G--- 5'	AliI, ApaCI, BamHI, Bce751I, Nsp29132II, Pfl8I, SolI, Uba4009I
NspBII		Nostoc sp.	5' CMGCKG; 3' GKCGMC	5' ---CMG CKG--- 3'; 3' ---GKC GMC--- 5'
NspHI		Nostoc sp.	5' RCATGY; 3' YGTACR	5' ---RCATG Y--- 3'; 3' ---Y GTACR--- 5'
NspLKI		Nocardia sp. LK	5' GGCC; 3' CCGG	5' ---GG CC--- 3'; 3' ---CC GG--- 5'
NspMACI		Nostoc sp.	5' AGATCT; 3' TCTAGA	5' ---A GATCT--- 3'; 3' ---TCTAG A--- 5'
NspSAI		Nostoc sp. SA	5' CYCGRG; 3' GRGCYC	5' ---C YCGRG--- 3'; 3' ---GRGCY C--- 5'	Ama87I, AvaI, Bse15I, BspLU4I, Eco27kI, **Nli3877I**, OfoI, PunAI
NspSAII		Nostoc sp. SA	5' GGTNACC; 3' CCANTGG	5' ---G GTNACC--- 3'; 3' ---CCANTG G--- 5'	AspAI, Bse64I, BseT9I, BseT10I, BstPI, Eco91I, NspSAII, PspEI
NspSAIV		Nostoc sp. SA	5' GGATCC; 3' CCTAGG	5' ---G GATCC--- 3'; 3' ---CCTAG G--- 5'	AliI, BamHI, Bsp98I, Bsp4009I, NspSAIV, Pfl8I, SolI, Uba4009I
NunII		Nocardia uniformis	5' GGCGCC; 3' CCGCGG	5' ---GG CGCC--- 3'; 3' ---CCGC GG--- 5'
