= N. flavescens =

N. flavescens may refer to:

- Nataxa flavescens, an Australasian moth
- Neisseria flavescens, a commensal bacterium
- Neoromicia flavescens, a vesper bat
- Nephrotoma flavescens, a crane fly
- Nerina flavescens, a calyptrate muscoid
- Nerita flavescens, a sea snail
- Nigma flavescens, an araneomorph spider
- Nisueta flavescens, a huntsman spider
- Nola flavescens, a tuft moth
- Nomada flavescens, a cuckoo bee
