= Neisseria bacilliformis =

Scientific classification
- Domain: Bacteria
- Kingdom: Pseudomonadati
- Phylum: Pseudomonadota
- Class: Betaproteobacteria
- Order: Neisseriales
- Family: Neisseriaceae
- Genus: Neisseria
- Species: N. bacilliformis

Binomial name
- Neisseria bacilliformis Han, et al., 2006

Type strain
- CCUG 50858 T MDA 2833; ATCC BAA-1200

Species of bacterium

Neisseria bacilliformis is a bacterium commonly found living as a commensal in the mucous membranes of mammals. However, depending on host immunocompetence, there have been documented cases of N. bacilliformis infections of the respiratory tract and oral cavity thus making it an opportunistic pathogen. It was originally isolated from patients being treated in a cancer center. Rarely, a more serious infection such as endocarditis can occur often as a result of a predisposing condition.

== Morphology ==
With the exceptions of N. elongata and N. weaveri, most members of the genus Neisseria have a cocci or diplococci cellular morphology. However, N. bacilliformis has a bacillus morphology measuring 0.6 μm by 1.3 μm to 3.0 μm. N. bacilliformis is nonmotile and it undergoes aerobic respiration. It stains Gram negative and has been successfully cultured on chocolate agar and sheep blood agar. No hemolysis has been observed. Growth has been documented on trypticase soy agar, but the size of the colonies are roughly half that of those cultured on chocolate agar and sheep blood agar. Growth has not been achieved on modified Thayer–Martin culture agar, the preferred media for culturing N. gonorrhoeae. Colonies are round, smooth, and have a light gray coloration. It tests positive for the oxidase test and negative for indole production. No acid is produced in the presence of dextrose, lactose, maltose, or sucrose. Some strains are capable of reducing nitrate and producing catalase. All strains that have been isolated thus far have shown susceptibility to antibiotics.

== Clinical differentiation ==
Clinical microbiology laboratories often misidentify N. bacilliformis as a member of the genus Pasteurella or Moraxella. They too are commensals of the respiratory tract, and encountering a Neisseria spp. with a bacillus morphology is unusual. Similar morphological and biochemical identifiers of N. elongata further compound such misidentifications. Thus it is possible that some cases that were identified as N. elongata infections using phenotypic assays may have been caused by N. bacilliformis. 16S rRNA phylogenetic analysis has been used to identify a member of Neisseria from closely related genera, but this method is unable to distinguish amongst the various species that compose the genus Neisseria. Whole-genome sequence data is currently the most reliable method to diagnose a N. bacilliformis infection. A proper identification is crucial in order to design the most effective antibiotic therapy.
