= Cystine tryptic agar =

Cystine tryptic agar (CTA), also known as cystine trypticase agar, is a growth medium used for the identification of microorganisms.

It can be used to determine if organisms can ferment various carbohydrates, including maltose, lactose, and sucrose. This approach can be used to type organisms because although strains quickly gain antibiotic resistance, they rarely gain the ability to metabolize new nutrients (though exceptions are known.) For example, the following fermentation patterns have been observed:

Organism	Fermentable sugars
Neisseria gonorrhoeae	glucose
Neisseria meningitidis	glucose, maltose
Neisseria lactamica	glucose, maltose, lactose
Neisseria mucosa	glucose, maltose, sucrose
Moraxella catarrhalis	none of the major sugars

== Typical composition ==
Cystine tryptic agar typically contains (w/v):

- 2.0 % casein
- 0.05 % L-cystine
- 0.5 % sodium chloride
- 0.05% sodium sulfite
- 0.25% agar
- 0.00017% phenol red
- 0.5% one of the sugars mentioned above

== See also ==
- TSI slant
