= Neisseria flava =

Scientific classification
- Domain: Bacteria
- Kingdom: Pseudomonadati
- Phylum: Pseudomonadota
- Class: Betaproteobacteria
- Order: Neisseriales
- Family: Neisseriaceae
- Genus: Neisseria
- Species: N. flava

Binomial name
- Neisseria flava Bergey et al. 1923 (Approved Lists 1980)

Species of bacterium

Neisseria flava (Latin: flava, yellow, golden) is a bacterium belonging to a group of species under the genus Neisseria that is considered non-pathogenic. Along with its other members of the non-pathogenic group, Neisseria flava is often found in the upper respiratory tract surface in humans. On rare occasions, it can cause rheumatic heart disease and ventricular septal defect aortic insufficiency.

== Identification ==
Steps

1. Perform Gram-stain to identify the bacterium in question, continue to step 2 if it is found to be Gram negative cocci.
2. Neisseria flava is an aerobic microbe, try growing some of the same in the presence in air/air + CO_{2}.
3. Transfer sample able to growth in air to a NA medium at 25C, continue to step 4 if colonies are observed.
  - If not, be aware of the microbe being handled, it is either Neisseria meningitidis or Neisseria gonorrhoeae, both of which are pathogenic.
1. Finally, perform nitrate test.

Alternative test is Oxidative/fermentation glucose test(O/F test). If found to be oxidative, it is Neisseria spp.

- If positive in the final test, the microbe is Moraxella.
- If negative in the final test, the microbe is Neisseria spp.
