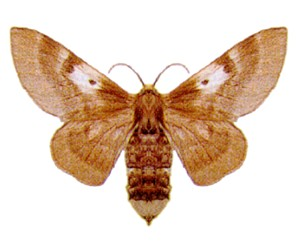
- Nataxa flavescens

Scientific classification
- Domain: Eukaryota
- Kingdom: Animalia
- Phylum: Arthropoda
- Class: Insecta
- Order: Lepidoptera
- Family: Anthelidae
- Genus: Nataxa; Walker, 1855

Synonyms
- Aproscepta Turner, 1944

= Nataxa =

Genus of moths

Nataxa is a genus of moths of the family Anthelidae. The genus was erected by Francis Walker in 1855.

== Species ==
- Nataxa amblopis (Turner, 1944)
- Nataxa flavescens (Walker, 1855)
