= Nataxa amblopis =

Scientific classification
- Domain: Eukaryota
- Kingdom: Animalia
- Phylum: Arthropoda
- Class: Insecta
- Order: Lepidoptera
- Family: Anthelidae
- Genus: Nataxa
- Species: N. amblopis

Binomial name
- Nataxa amblopis (Turner, 1944)

Synonyms
- Aproscepta amblopis Turner, 1944

Species of moth

Nataxa amblopis is a moth of the family Anthelidae. It was described by Alfred Jefferis Turner in 1944. It is found in Australia.
