= NlaIII =

Restriction enzyme

NlaIII is a type II restriction enzyme isolated from Neisseria lactamica. As part of the restriction modification system, NlaIII is able to prevent foreign DNA from integrating into the host genome by cutting double stranded DNA into fragments at specific sequences. This results in further degradation of the fragmented foreign DNA and prevents it from infecting the host genome.

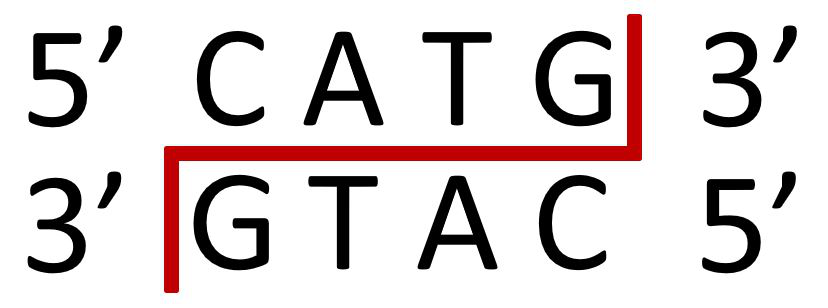
Recognition site of NlaIII with a red line indicating the cutting pattern

NlaIII recognizes the palindromic and complementary DNA sequence of CATG/GTAC and cuts outside of the G-C base pairs. This cutting pattern results in sticky ends with GTAC overhangs at the 3' end.

== Characteristics ==
NlaIII from N. lactamica contains two key components: a methylase and an endonuclease. The methylase is critical to recognition, while the endonuclease is used for cutting. The gene (NlaIIIR) is 693 bp long and creates the specific 5’-CATG-3’ endonuclease. A homolog of NlaIIIR is iceA1 from Helicobacter pylori. In H. pylori, there exists a similar methylase gene called hpyIM which is downstream of iceA1. ICEA1 is an endonuclease that also recognizes the 5’-CATG-3’ sequence. IceA1 in H. pylori is similar to that of NlaIII in N. lactamica.

NlaIII contains an ICEA protein that encompasses the 4 to 225 amino acid region. H. pylori also contains the same protein. H. pylori infection often leads to gastrointestinal issues such as peptic ulcers, gastric adenocarcinoma and lymphoma. Researchers speculate that ICEA proteins serve as potential markers for gastric cancer

=== Isoschizomers ===
NlaIII isoschizomers recognize and cut the same recognition sequence 5’-CATG-3’. Endonucleases that cut at this sequence include:

- Fael
- Fatl
- Hin1II
- Hsp92II
- CviAII
- IceA1

== Applications ==
NlaIII can be used in many different experimental procedures such as:

- Serial analysis of gene expression
- Molecular cloning
- Restriction site mapping
- Genotyping
- Southern blotting
- Restriction fragment length polymorphism (RFLP) analysis
