= Neisseria animaloris =

Scientific classification
- Domain: Bacteria
- Kingdom: Pseudomonadati
- Phylum: Pseudomonadota
- Class: Betaproteobacteria
- Order: Neisseriales
- Family: Neisseriaceae
- Genus: Neisseria
- Species: N. animaloris

Binomial name
- Neisseria animaloris Vandamme et al. 2006

Species of bacterium

Neisseria animaloris, formerly named CDC group EF-4a, is a gram-negative coccoid rod. The bacterium is a commensal of the upper respiratory tract of cats and dogs, and they may cause pulmonary infections in cat. In humans Neisseria animaloris have been reported to cause wound infection after animal bites but also chronic otitis media, bacteremia and endophtalmitis.

On blood agar colonies are haemolytic yellowish white, opaque, shiny and smooth. They are oxidase and catalase-positive but indol negative and as a distinct characteristic N amimaloris is arginine dihydrolase positive. Unlike most other Neisseria species N animaloris grows on McConkey agar.
