= Mogibacterium pumilum =

Scientific classification
- Domain: Bacteria
- Kingdom: Bacillati
- Phylum: Bacillota
- Class: Clostridia
- Order: Peptostreptococcales
- Family: Anaerovoracaceae
- Genus: Mogibacterium
- Species: M. pumilum

Binomial name
- Mogibacterium pumilum Nakazawa et al. 2000

Type strain
- ATCC 700696, D2-18, JCM 11202

Species of bacterium

Mogibacterium pumilum is a Gram-positive, anaerobic, rod-shaped and non-spore-forming bacterium from the genus Mogibacterium which has been isolated from the Periodontal pocket of a human.
