= TSI slant =

Differential medium used in microbiology

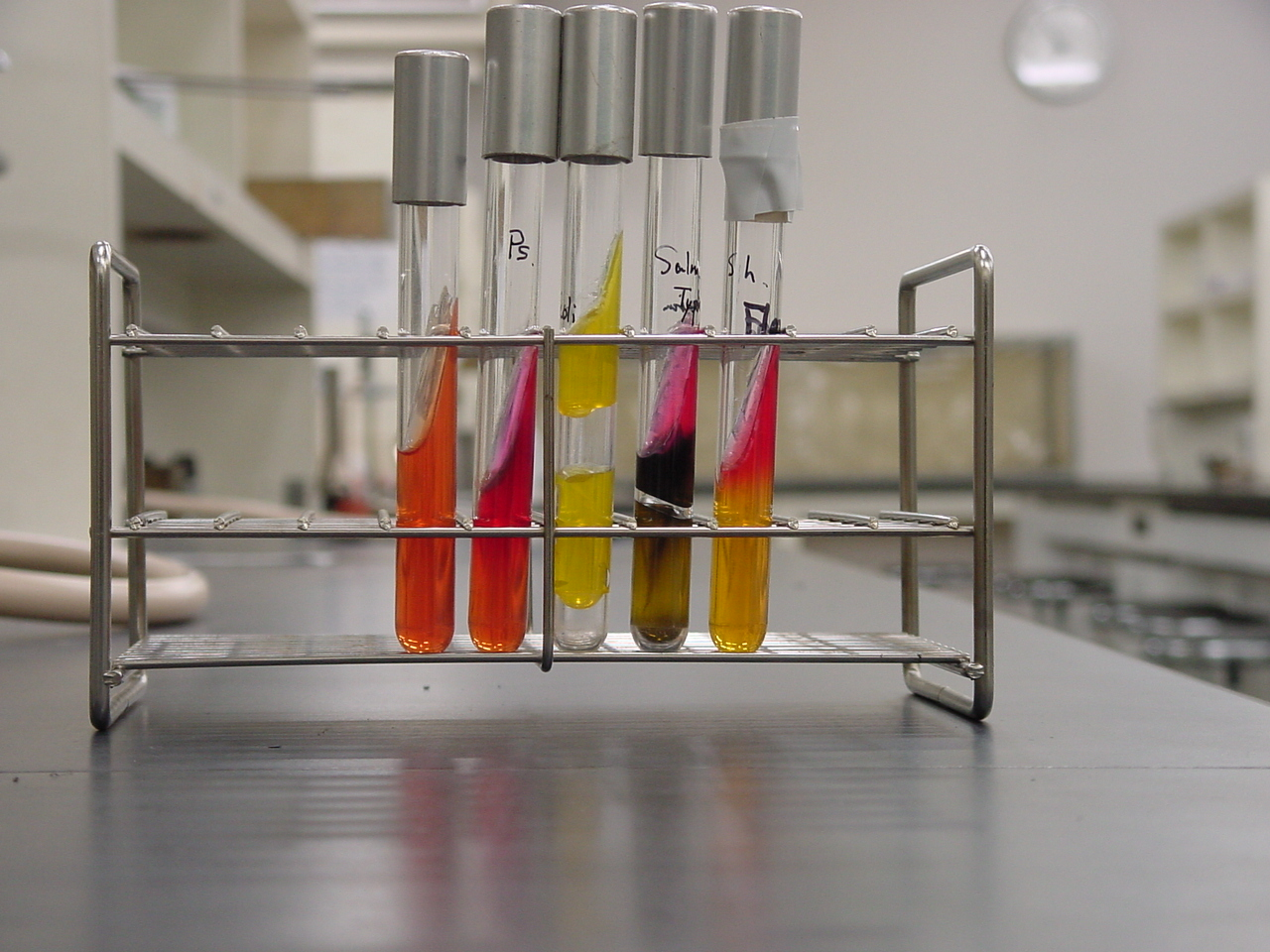
TSI agar slant results: (from left) uninoculated (as control), P. aeruginosa, E. coli, Salmonella Typhimurium, Shigella flexneri

The Triple Sugar Iron (TSI) test is a microbiological test roughly named for its ability to test a microorganism's ability to ferment sugars and to produce hydrogen sulfide. It is often used to differentiate enteric bacteria including Salmonella and Shigella.

== Composition ==
The TSI slant is a test tube that contains agar, a pH-sensitive dye (phenol red), 1% lactose, 1% sucrose, 0.1% glucose, and sodium thiosulfate and ferrous sulfate or ferrous ammonium sulfate.

All of these ingredients are mixed together, heated to sterility, and allowed to solidify in the test tube at a slanted angle. The slanted shape of this medium provides an array of surfaces that are either exposed to oxygen-containing air in varying degrees (an aerobic environment) or not exposed to air (an anaerobic environment).

TSI agar medium was developed based on Kligler's Iron Agar, which had been used for the determination of lactose-fermentative bacteria, by addition of sucrose to be able to detect sucrose-fermentative bacteria, also.

== Interpretation of results ==
Bacteria that ferment any of the three sugars in the medium will produce byproducts. These byproducts are usually acids, which will change the color of the red pH-sensitive dye (phenol red) to a yellow color. Position of the color change distinguishes the acid production associated with glucose fermentation from the acidic byproducts of lactose or sucrose fermentation. If this occurs, the newly formed hydrogen sulfide (H_{2}S) reacts with ferrous sulfate in the medium to form ferrous sulfide, which is visible as a black precipitate. Examples of sulfide-producing bacteria include Salmonella, Proteus, Citrobacter and Edwardsiella species. The blackening of the medium is almost always observed in the butt (bottom) of the medium.

A bacterium that is a non-lactose fermenter and ferments glucose, initially causes a yellow slant/yellow bottom (acid/acid reaction) after 8 hours but then converts to a red slant/yellow bottom after 24 hours (alkali/acid reaction). Whereas if it ferments both lactose and glucose, it results in a yellow/yellow tube and remains that way due to the large amount of acid produced in the reaction. Blackening of the bottom due to H_{2}S production may mask the acid reaction (yellow) in the bottom of the tube. Salmonella enterica serovar Typhi may result in blackening of the medium at the interface of bottom and the slant.

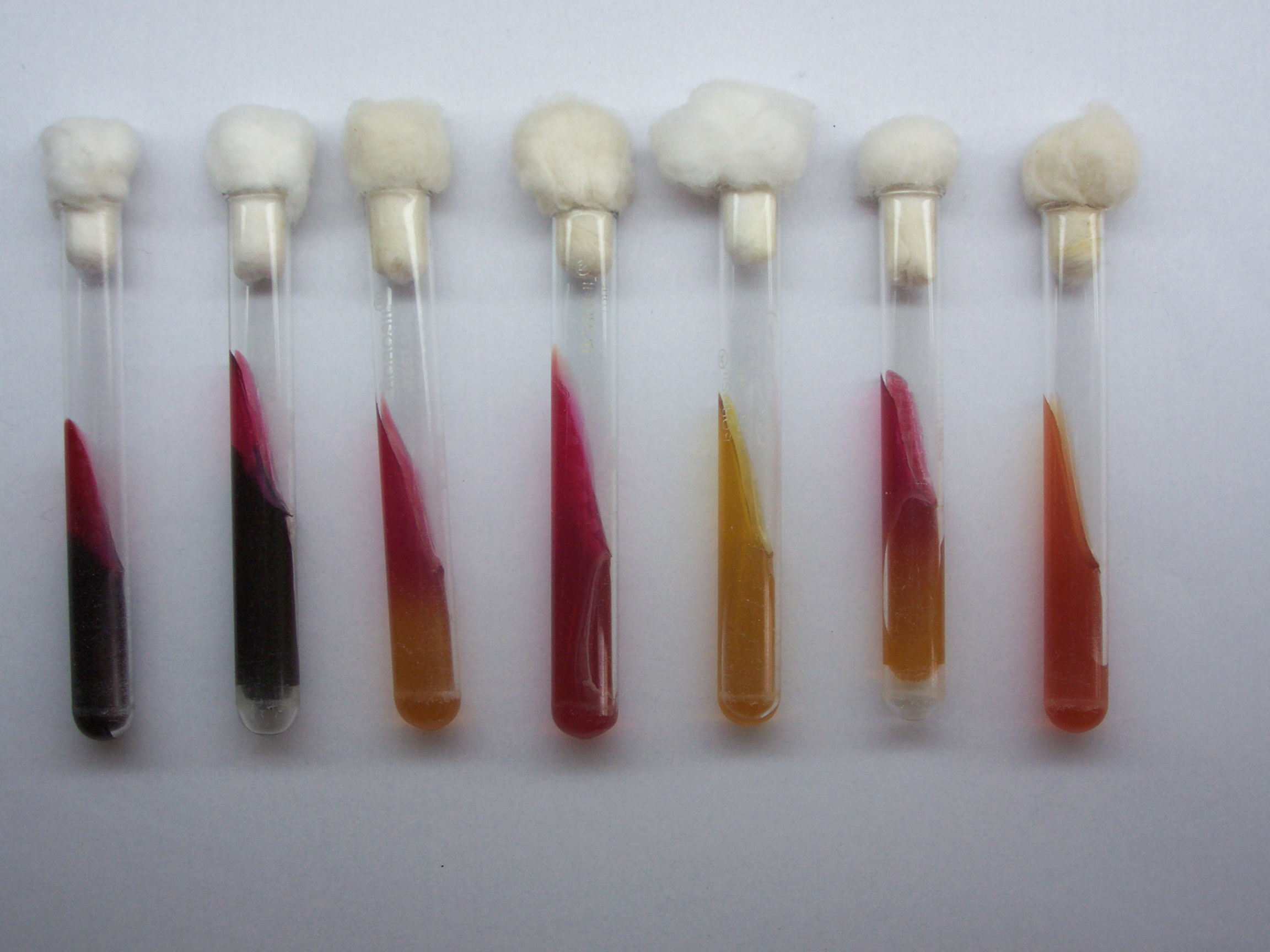
Various reactions seen in TSI agar

Under anaerobic conditions (as occur toward the bottom of the tube) some bacteria use thiosulfate as an electron acceptor and reduce it to hydrogen gas. This is not very soluble and may accumulate as bubbles along the inoculation track, between the agar and the glass, or in the fluid which accumulates at the bottom of the slant. Hydrogen production may lift the agar from the butt of the tube or fracture the agar (crack the agar). Carbon dioxide, if produced, may not show as bubbles because it is far more soluble in the medium.

== See also ==
- Cystine tryptic agar
