= Mogibacterium diversum =

Scientific classification
- Domain: Bacteria
- Kingdom: Bacillati
- Phylum: Bacillota
- Class: Clostridia
- Order: Peptostreptococcales
- Family: Anaerovoracaceae
- Genus: Mogibacterium
- Species: M. diversum

Binomial name
- Mogibacterium diversum Nakazawa et al. 2002

Type strain
- ATCC 700923, CCUG 47132, CIP 107383, HM-7, JCM 11205

Species of bacterium

Mogibacterium diversum is a Gram-positive, anaerobic, rod-shaped and non-spore-forming bacterium from the genus Mogibacterium which has been isolated from the human mouth.
