= International Pathogenic Neisseria Conference =

The International Pathogenic Neisseria Conference (IPNC) occurs every two years and is a forum for the presentation of cutting-edge research on all aspects of the genus Neisseria. This includes immunology, vaccinology and physiology and metabolism of Neisseria meningitidis, Neisseria gonorrhoeae and the commensal species.

== History ==
In the 1970s a series of conferences were held dealing with issues of meningococcal epidemiology and vaccination. Some of these conferences were held in Milano, St. Paul de Vence, and Marseille. The first official conference was held in San Francisco, California, 1978. The location of the conference switched between North America and Europe until 2006 when the venue was located in Cairns, Australia. The meeting in South Africa was, for the first time, held both in person and on line, and was delayed from 2020 to 2022; subsequently, the 2022 meeting in Boston was delayed to 2023.

== List of Conferences ==
Number of Conferences	Year	Location	Chair Persons (till 2002)/ Co-Conveners (After 2004)
1st	1978	San Francisco, California, USA	G.F. Brooks
2nd	1980	Hemavan, Sweden	S. Normark and D. Danielsson
3rd	1982	Montreal, Canada	I.WDeVoe
4th	1984	Asilomar, California, USA	G.K. Schoolnik
5th	1986	Noordwijkerhout, The Netherlands	J.T. Poolman
6th	1988	Pine Mountain, Georgia, USA	S.A. Morse
7th	1990	Berlin, Germany	M. Achtman
8th	1992	Cuernavaca, Mexico	C.I. Conde-Glez
9th	1994	Winchester, England	M.C.J. Maiden and I Feavers
10th	1996	Baltimore, Maryland, USA	C.E. Frasch
11th	1998	Nice, France	X. Nassif
12th	2000	Galveston, Texas, USA	F. Sparling and P. Rice
13th	2002	Oslo, Norway	E. Wedege
14th	2004	Milwaukee, Wisconsin, USA	M.A. Apicella and H. Seifert
15th	2006	Cairns, North Queensland, Australia	J. Davies and M. Jennings
16th	2008	Rotterdam, The Netherlands	L. van Alphen, P. van der Lay and G. van den Dobbelsteen
17th	2010	Banff, Canada	Anthony Schryvers and Scott Gray-Owen
18th	2012	Würzburg, Germany	Matthias Frosch, Ulrich Vogel and Thomas Rudel
19th	2014	Asheville, North Carolina, USA	Ann Jerse, Cynthia Nau Cornelissen and Joe Dillard
20th	2016	Manchester, United Kingdom	Ray Borrow, Christoph Tang
21st	2018	Asilomar, California, USA	Peter T Beernink, Gregory Moe and Dan M Granoff
22nd	2022	Cape Town, South Africa	Mignon du Plessis, Anne von Gottberg, Susan Meiring
23rd	2023	Boston, Massachusetts, USA	Lee Wetzler, Caroline Genco, Paola Massari
24th	2025	Florence, Italy	Chiara Azzari, Mariagrazia Pizza, Rino Rappuoli

== The Igor Stojiljkovic Memorial Fund ==
In memory of Igor Stojiljkovic a scholarship fund has been initiated through the Emory University School of Medicine, to be used exclusively to provide travel funds to young investigators so that they can attend bacterial pathogenesis meetings such as the IPNC.
