= Neisseria weaveri =

Scientific classification
- Domain: Bacteria
- Kingdom: Pseudomonadati
- Phylum: Pseudomonadota
- Class: Betaproteobacteria
- Order: Neisseriales
- Family: Neisseriaceae
- Genus: Neisseria
- Species: N. weaveri

Binomial name
- Neisseria weaveri Holmes et al. 1993

Species of bacterium

Neisseria weaveri is a gram-negative bacterium associated with dog bite wounds. It is rod-shaped and non-motile with type strain M-5.

The genome sequences of two strains (LMG 5135T and ATCC 51223T) were determined and deposited into GenBank (accession numbers AFWQ00000000 and AFWR00000000), respectively. Each genome was 2.1 Mb in size (excluding gaps) and had a G + C content of 49.0%. The genomic contents of the two N. weaveri strains were very similar, containing 2233 and 2099 predicted coding sequences (CDSs), respectively.

== Pathogenesis ==
Neisseria weaveri infections are predominantly associated with animal bite wounds.

A case of lower respiratory infection due to N. weaveri has been reported.
