= Succinivibrionaceae =

Scientific classification
- Domain: Bacteria
- Kingdom: Pseudomonadati
- Phylum: Pseudomonadota
- Class: Gammaproteobacteria
- Order: Aeromonadales
- Family: Succinivibrionaceae

Genera
- Anaerobiospirillum; Ruminobacter; Succinatimonas; Succinimonas; Succinivibrio

Family of bacteria

The Succinivibrionaceae are Gram-negative bacteria and belong to the Gammaproteobacteria. They are rod-shaped and obligate anaerobes.
