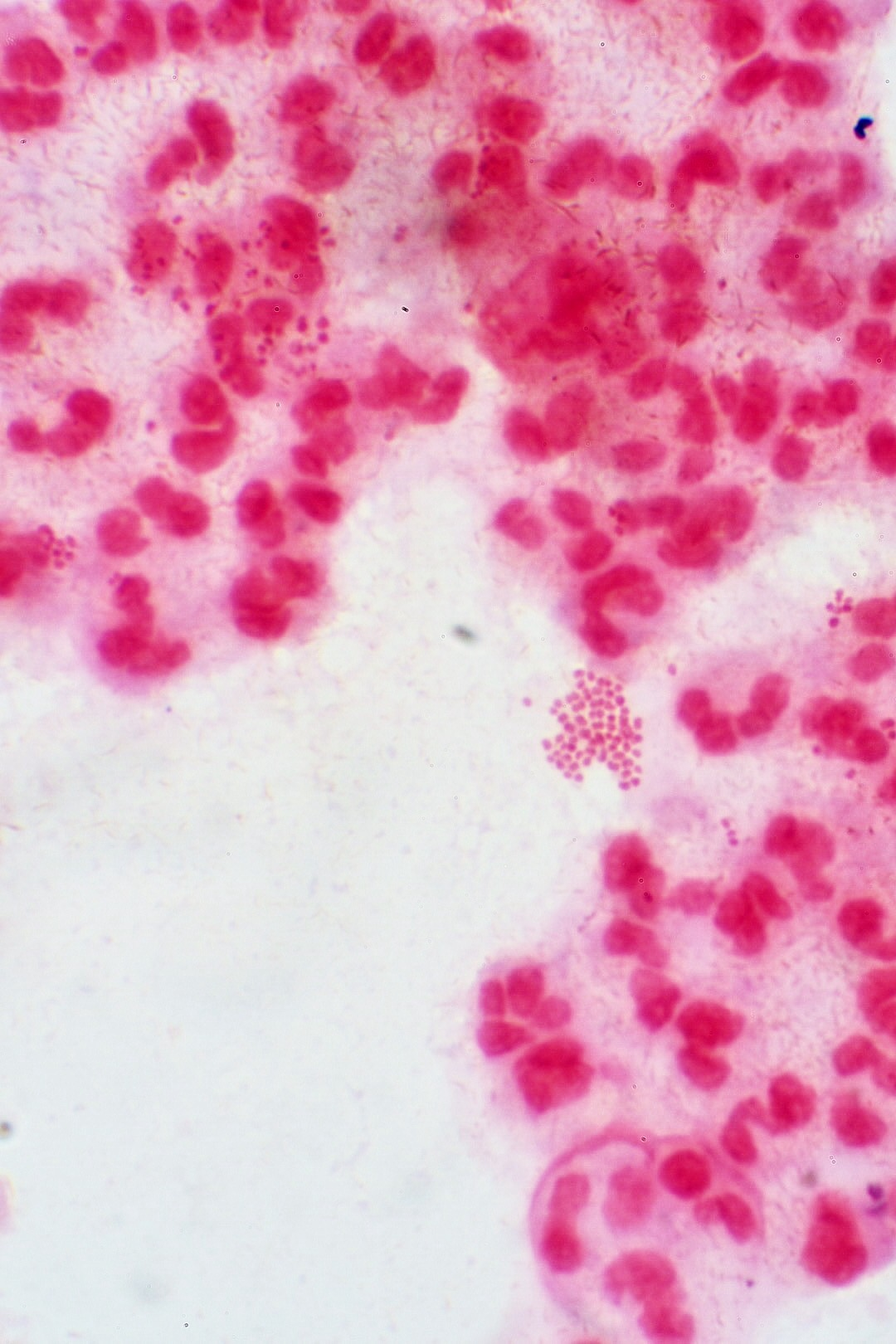
- Neisseria gonorrhoeae by Gram-stain

Scientific classification
- Domain: Bacteria
- Kingdom: Pseudomonadati
- Phylum: Pseudomonadota
- Class: Betaproteobacteria
- Order: Neisseriales
- Family: Neisseriaceae
- Genus: Neisseria; Trevisan, 1885

Species
- N. animalis
- N. animaloris
- N. bacilliformis
- N. canis
- N. cinerea
- N. dentiae
- N. dumasiana
- N. elongata
- N. flava
- N. flavescens
- N. gonorrhoeae
- N. iguanae
- N. lactamica
- N. macacae
- N. meningitidis
- N. mucosa
- N. oralis
- N. perflava
- N. pharyngis
- N. polysaccharea
- N. shayeganii
- N. sicca
- N. subflava
- N. wadsworthii
- N. weaveri
- N. zoodegmatis

= Neisseria =

Genus of bacteria

Neisseria is a large genus of bacteria that colonize the mucous membranes of many animals. Of the 11 species that colonize humans, only two are pathogens: N. meningitidis and N. gonorrhoeae.

Neisseria species are Gram-negative bacteria included among the Pseudomonadota, a large group of Gram-negative forms. Neisseria diplococci resemble coffee beans when viewed microscopically.

== Pathogenesis and classification ==
=== Pathogens ===
Species of this genus (family Neisseriaceae) of parasitic bacteria grow in pairs and occasionally fours, and thrive best at 98.6 °F (37 °C) in the animal body or serum media.

The genus includes:

- N. gonorrhoeae (also called the gonococcus) causes gonorrhea.
- N. meningitidis (also called the meningococcus) is one of the most common causes of bacterial meningitis and the causative agent of meningococcal septicaemia.

The immune system's neutrophils are restricted in function due to the ability of Neisseria to evade opsonization by antibodies, and to replicate within neutrophils despite phagocytosis. Neisseria species are also able to alter their antigens to avoid being engulfed by a process called antigenic variation, which is observed primarily in surface-located molecules. The pathogenic species along with some commensal species, have type IV pili which serve multiple functions for this organism. Some functions of the type IV pili include: mediating attachment to various cells and tissues, twitching motility, natural competence, microcolony formation, extensive intrastrain phase, and antigenic variation.

Neisseria bacteria have also been shown to be an important factor in the early stages of canine plaque development.

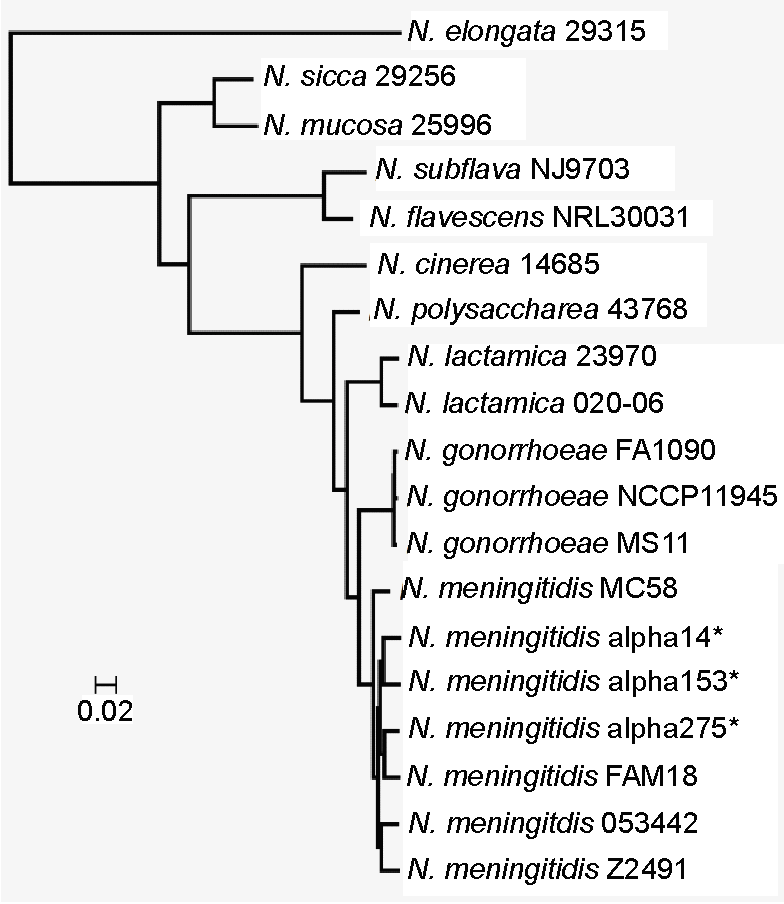
Phylogenetic tree of selected Neisseria species, based on concatenating the DNA sequences of all 896 core Neisseria genes, from Marri et al. 2010

=== Nonpathogens ===
This genus also contains several, believed to be commensal, or nonpathogenic, species:

- Neisseria bacilliformis
- Neisseria cinerea
- Neisseria elongata
- Neisseria flavescens
- Neisseria lactamica
- Neisseria macacae
- Neisseria mucosa
- Neisseria oralis
- Neisseria polysaccharea
- Neisseria sicca
- Neisseria subflava
- Neisseria flava

However, some of these can be associated with disease.

== Biochemical identification ==
All the medically significant species of Neisseria are positive for both catalase and oxidase. Different Neisseria species can be identified by the sets of sugars from which they will produce acid. For example, N. gonorrhoeae makes acid from only glucose, but N. meningitidis produces acid from both glucose and maltose.

Polysaccharide capsule. N. meningitidis has a polysaccharide capsule that surrounds the outer membrane of the bacterium and protects against soluble immune effector mechanisms within the serum. It is considered to be an essential virulence factor for the bacteria. N. gonorrhoeae possesses no such capsule.

Unlike most other Gram-negative bacteria, which possess lipopolysaccharide (LPS), both pathogenic and commensal species of Neisseria have a lipooligosaccharide (LOS) which consists of a core polysaccharide and lipid A. It functions as an endotoxin, protects against antimicrobial peptides, and adheres to the asialoglycoprotein receptor on urethral epithelium. LOS is highly stimulatory to the human immune system. LOS sialylation (by the enzyme Lst) prevents phagocytosis by neutrophils and complement deposition. LOS modification by phosphoethanolamine (by the enzyme LptA) provides resistance to antimicrobial peptides and complement. Strains of the same species have the ability to produce different LOS glycoforms.

== History ==
The genus Neisseria is named after the German bacteriologist Albert Neisser, who in 1879 discovered its first example, Neisseria gonorrhoeae, the pathogen which causes the human disease gonorrhea. Neisser also co-discovered the pathogen that causes leprosy, Mycobacterium leprae. These discoveries were made possible by the development of new staining techniques which he helped to develop.

== Genomes ==
The genomes of at least 10 Neisseria species have been completely sequenced. The best-studied species are N. meningitidis with more than 70 strains and N. gonorrhoeae with at least 10 strains completely sequenced. Other complete genomes are available for N. elongata, N. lactamica, and N. weaveri. Whole genome shotgun sequences are available for hundreds of other species and strains. N. meningitidis encodes 2,440 to 2,854 proteins while N. gonorrhoeae encodes from 2,603 to 2,871 proteins. N. weaveri (strain NCTC 13585) has the smallest known genome with only 2,060 encoded proteins although N. meningitidis MC58 has been reported to have only 2049 genes. The genomes are generally quite similar. For example, when the genome of N. gonorrhoeae (strain FA1090) is compared to that of N. meningitidis (strain H44/76) 68% of their genes are shared.

Genome properties of Neisseria sp.
species	Size (bp)	gene number
N. elongata	2,260,105	2589
N. sicca	2,786,309	2842
N. mucosa	2,542,952	2594
N. subflava	2,288,219	2303
N. flavescens	2,199,447	2240
N. cinerea	1,876,338	2050
N. polysaccharea	2,043,594	2268
N. lactamica 23970	2,148,211	2359
N. gonorrhoeae FA1090	2,153,922	2002
N. meningitidis MC58	2,184,406	2049

== Vaccine ==
Diseases caused by N. meningitidis and N. gonorrhoeae are significant health problems worldwide, the control of which is largely dependent on the availability and widespread use of comprehensive meningococcal vaccines. Development of neisserial vaccines has been challenging due to the nature of these organisms, in particular the heterogeneity, variability and/or poor immunogenicity of their outer surface components. As strictly human pathogens, they are highly adapted to the host environment, but have evolved several mechanisms to remain adaptable to changing microenvironments and avoid elimination by the host immune system. Currently, serogroup A, B, C, Y, and W-135 meningococcal infections can be prevented by vaccines. However, the prospect of developing a gonococcal vaccine is remote.

== Antibiotic resistance ==
The acquisition of cephalosporin resistance in N. gonorrhoeae, particularly ceftriaxone resistance, has greatly complicated the treatment of gonorrhea, with the gonococcus now being classified as a "superbug".

== Genetic transformation ==
Genetic transformation is the process by which a recipient bacterial cell takes up DNA from a neighboring cell and integrates this DNA into the recipient's genome by recombination. In N. meningitidis and N. gonorrhoeae, DNA transformation requires the presence of short DNA sequences (9-10 monomers residing in coding regions) of the donor DNA. These sequences are called DNA uptake sequences (DUSs). Specific recognition of DUSs is mediated by a type IV pilin. Davidsen et al. reported that in N. meningitidis and N. gonorrhoeae, DUSs occur at a significantly higher density in genes involved in DNA repair and recombination (as well as in restriction-modification and replication) than in other annotated gene groups. These authors proposed that the over-representation of DUS in DNA repair and recombination genes may reflect the benefit of maintaining the integrity of the DNA repair and recombination machinery by preferentially taking up genome maintenance genes that could replace their damaged counterparts in the recipient cell. Caugant and Maiden noted that the distribution of DUS is consistent with recombination being primarily a mechanism for genome repair that can occasionally result in generation of diversity, which even more occasionally, is adaptive. It was also suggested by Michod et al. that an important benefit of transformation in N. gonorrhoeae is recombinational repair of oxidative DNA damages caused by oxidative attack by the host's phagocytic cells.

== International Pathogenic Neisseria Conference ==
The International Pathogenic Neisseria Conference (IPNC), occurring every two years, is a forum for the presentation of cutting-edge research on all aspects of the genus Neisseria. This includes immunology, vaccinology, and physiology and metabolism of N. meningitidis, N. gonorrhoeae and the commensal species. The first IPNC took place in 1978, and the most recent one was in September 2016. Normally, the location of the conference switches between North America and Europe, but it took place in Australia for the first time in 2006, where the venue was located in Cairns.
