= Anaerobiospirillum =

Scientific classification
- Domain: Bacteria
- Kingdom: Pseudomonadati
- Phylum: Pseudomonadota
- Class: Gammaproteobacteria
- Order: Aeromonadales
- Family: Succinivibrionaceae
- Genus: Anaerobiospirillum; Davis et al. 1976 (Approved Lists 1980)

Species
- Anaerobiospirillum succiniciproducens Davis et al. 1976 (Approved Lists 1980); Anaerobiospirillum thomasii Malnick 1997

Genus of bacteria

Anaerobiospirillum is a genus of Gram-negative anaerobic bacteria.
