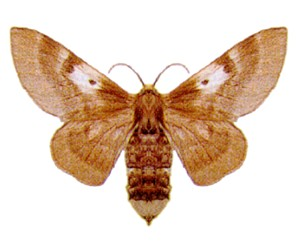
- Adult male

Scientific classification
- Kingdom: Animalia
- Phylum: Arthropoda
- Class: Insecta
- Order: Lepidoptera
- Family: Anthelidae
- Genus: Nataxa
- Species: N. flavescens

Binomial name
- Nataxa flavescens (Walker, 1855)

Synonyms
- Perna flavescens Walker, 1855; Nataxa flavifascia Walker, 1855; Nataxa rubida Walker, 1865; Dicreagra ochrocephala Felder & Rogenhofer, 1874

= Nataxa flavescens =

Species of moth

Nataxa flavescens, the yellow-headed anthelid, is a species of moth in the family Anthelidae.It was first described by Francis Walker in 1855 and is found in Australasia.

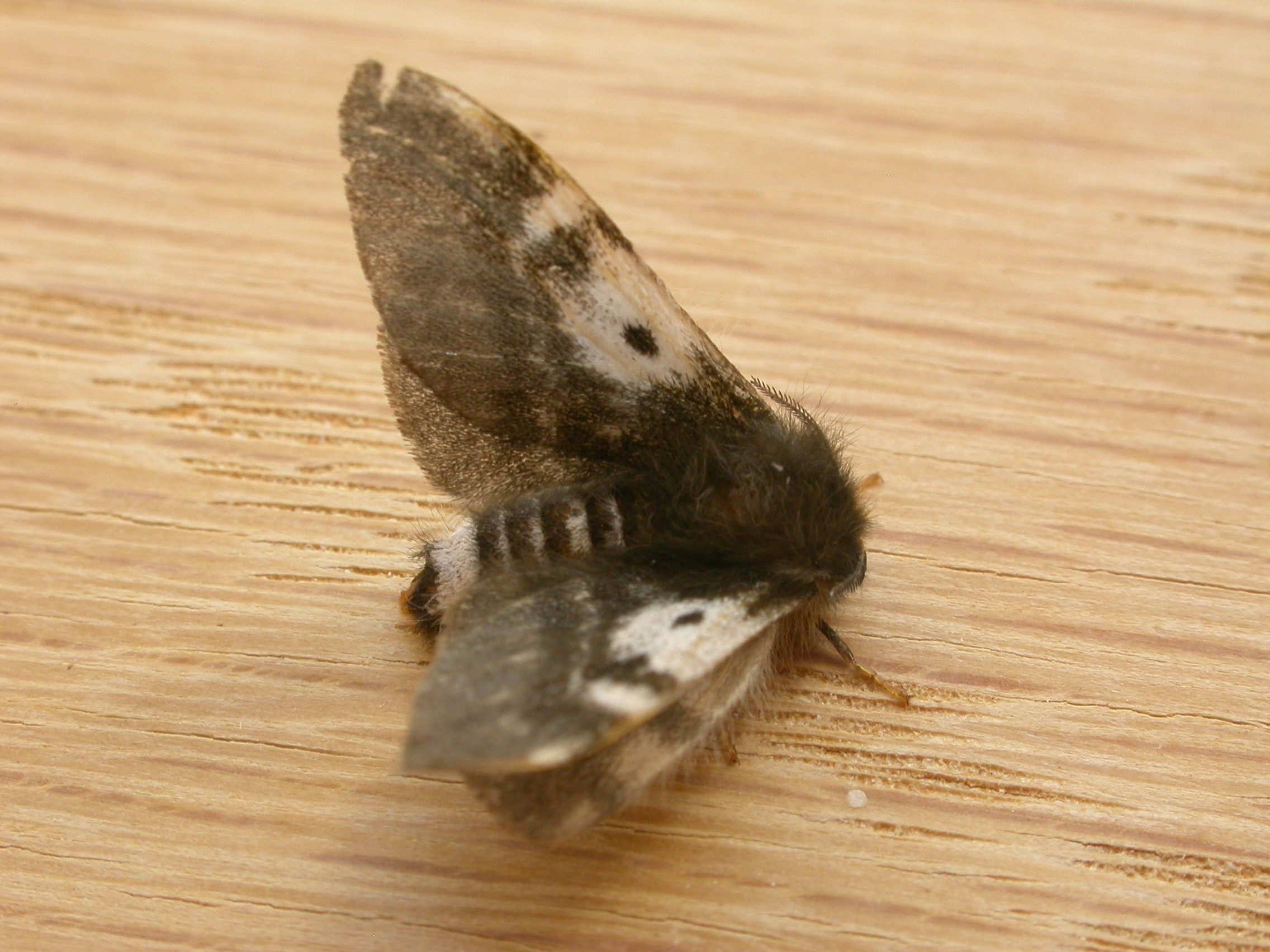
Adult female

The wingspan of the grey-winged female is approximately 40 mm, while that of the male is approximately 30 mm.
