= Lawsonibacter asaccharolyticus =

Species of bacterium

Lawsonibacter asaccharolyticus is an obligately anaerobic, gram-positive, non-spore-forming, straight rod-shaped human gut microbiome bacterium associated with coffee consumption.
