= Staphylococcus saccharolyticus =

Scientific classification
- Domain: Bacteria
- Kingdom: Bacillati
- Phylum: Bacillota
- Class: Bacilli
- Order: Bacillales
- Family: Staphylococcaceae
- Genus: Staphylococcus
- Species: S. saccharolyticus

Binomial name
- Staphylococcus saccharolyticus Kilpper-Bälz and Schleifer 1981

Species of bacterium

Staphylococcus saccharolyticus is a Gram-positive, coagulase-negative, anaerobic member of the bacterial genus Staphylococcus consisting of single and clustered cocci. The species was formerly known as Peptococcus saccharolyticus, but was reclassified on the basis of 16S ribosomal RNA and biochemical similarity to other members of Staphylococcus.

== Pathogenicity ==
Staphylococcus saccharolyticus may be a cause of infective endocarditis. This species is also known to contaminate samples of platelets taken from humans, though these contaminated samples generally do not cause S. saccharolyticus infections during transfusion.
