= Succinatimonas =

Scientific classification
- Domain: Bacteria
- Kingdom: Pseudomonadati
- Phylum: Pseudomonadota
- Class: Gammaproteobacteria
- Order: Aeromonadales
- Family: Succinivibrionaceae
- Genus: Succinatimonas; Morotomi et al. 2010

Type species
- Succinatimonas hippei

Species
- S. hippei

Genus of bacteria

Succinatimonas is a Gram-negative, rod-shaped, spore-forming, strictly aerobic and non-motile genus of bacteria from the family of Succinivibrionaceae with one known species (Succinatimonas hippei). Succinatimonas hippei has been isolated from human faeces. This bacteria is known for its ability to spread pathogens in a small population.
