= Peptoniphilus indolicus =

Scientific classification
- Domain: Bacteria
- Kingdom: Bacillati
- Phylum: Bacillota
- Class: Clostridia
- Order: Tissierellales
- Family: Peptoniphilaceae
- Genus: Peptoniphilus
- Species: P. indolicus

Binomial name
- Peptoniphilus indolicus (Christiansen 1934) Ezaki et al. 2001

Synonyms
- Micrococcus indolicus Peptococcus indolicus Peptostreptococcus indolicus "Schleiferella indolica"

Species of bacterium

Peptoniphilus indolicus is a bacterium in the family of Peptoniphilaceae.
