= Oxidative/fermentation glucose test =

Oxidative/fermentation glucose test (OF glucose test) is a biological technique. It was developed in 1953 by Hugh and Leifson to be utilized in microbiology to determine the way a microorganism metabolizes a carbohydrate such as glucose (dextrose). OF-glucose deeps contain glucose as a carbohydrate, peptones, bromothymol blue indicator for Hugh-Leifson's OF medium or phenol red for King's OF medium, and 0.5% agar.

To perform the OF-glucose test, two tubes of OF-glucose medium are inoculated with the test organism. A layer of mineral oil is added to the top of the deep in one of the tubes to create anaerobic conditions. Oil is not added to the other tube to allow for aerobic conditions. The tubes are then incubated for 24–48 hours. If the medium in the anaerobic tube turns yellow, then the bacteria are fermenting glucose. If the tube with oil doesn't turn yellow, but the open tube does turn yellow, then the bacterium is oxidizing glucose. If the tube with mineral oil doesn't change, and the open tube turns blue, then the organism neither ferments, nor oxidizes glucose. Instead it oxidizes peptones, which liberates ammonia, turning the indicator blue.

If only the aerobic tube has turned yellow then the organism is able to oxidase glucose aerobically ("O"). By-products: CO_{2} and although organic acids may be present at low rates.

If both tubes are yellow then the organism is capable of fermentation ("F").

If there is, however, growth evident on the aerobic tube yet the medium has not turned yellow, either (a) glucose has been respired and evolved CO_{2} without significant production of acid, or (b) the organism is respiring the peptone.
