= Mogibacterium =

Scientific classification
- Domain: Bacteria
- Kingdom: Bacillati
- Phylum: Bacillota
- Class: Clostridia
- Order: Peptostreptococcales
- Family: Anaerovoracaceae
- Genus: Mogibacterium; Nakazawa et al. 2000

Type species
- Mogibacterium pumilum Nakazawa et al. 2000

Species
- Mogibacterium diversum; Mogibacterium kristiansenii; Mogibacterium neglectum; Mogibacterium pumilum; Mogibacterium timidum; Mogibacterium vescum

Genus of bacteria

Mogibacterium is a Gram-positive, strictly anaerobic and non-spore-forming bacterial genus from the family Anaerovoracaceae.

== Phylogeny ==
The currently accepted taxonomy is based on the List of Prokaryotic names with Standing in Nomenclature (LPSN) and National Center for Biotechnology Information (NCBI)

16S rRNA based LTP_10_2024

- - - Baileyella
    - Mogibacterium kristiansenii Wylensek et al. 2021
  - - Mogibacterium
      - M. timidum (Holdeman et al. 1980) Nakazawa et al. 2000
      - - M. pumilum Nakazawa et al. 2000
        - - M. vescum Nakazawa et al. 2000
          - - M. diversum Nakazawa et al. 2002
            - M. neglectum Nakazawa et al. 2002

120 marker proteins based GTDB 09-RS220

- Mogibacterium
  - M. kristiansenii
  - - M. timidum
    - - M. pumilum
      - - M. diversum
        - M. neglectum
