= Micrococcus lylae =

Scientific classification
- Domain: Bacteria
- Kingdom: Bacillati
- Phylum: Actinomycetota
- Class: Actinomycetes
- Order: Micrococcales
- Family: Micrococcaceae
- Genus: Micrococcus
- Species: M. lylae

Binomial name
- Micrococcus lylae Kloos et al. 1974

Species of bacterium

Micrococcus lylae is a gram positive bacterium. The normal habitat for this Micrococcus species is skin, dust, and water. Its type strain is ATCC 27566. It grows in tetrads, irregular clusters, and cubical packets of eight, and colonies are often brightly pigmented. They are strictly aerobic.

== See also ==
- Kocuria kristinae
