= Kocuria rosea =

Scientific classification
- Domain: Bacteria
- Kingdom: Bacillati
- Phylum: Actinomycetota
- Class: Actinomycetes
- Order: Micrococcales
- Family: Micrococcaceae
- Genus: Kocuria
- Species: K. rosea

Binomial name
- Kocuria rosea (Flügge 1886) Stackebrandt et al. 1995

Type strain
- ATCC 186; CCM 679; CCUG 4312; CIP 71.15; DSM 20447; IEGM 394; IFO 3768; JCM 11614; LMG 14224; NBRC 3768; NCTC 7523; NRRL B-2977; VKM B-1823

Synonyms
- Pelczaria aurantia Poston 1994; Deinococcus erythromyxa (ex Chester 1901) Brooks and Murray 1981; Micrococcus roseus Flügge 1886 (Approved Lists 1980); Kocuria erythromyxa (Brooks and Murray 1981) Rainey et al. 1997

Species of bacterium

Kocuria rosea is a gram-positive bacteria that is catalase-positive and oxidase-positive. It has a coccus shape that occurs in the tetrad arrangement and is a strict aerobe that grows best from 25 to 37 °C. K. rosea has also been found to cause urinary tract infections in people with weakened immune systems.

The normal habitat for this Kocuria species is skin, soil, and water. It derives its name from the carotenoid pigment that it secretes. Isolated colonies on a TSA plate are circular, 1.0–1.5 mm in size, slightly convex, smooth, and pink in color.

== Metabolism ==
K. rosea has been found to be able to biodegrade malachite green, azo dyes, triphenylmethane, as well as some other industrial dyes. Due to its ability to biodegrade these dyes, it has become of interest as a potential means to biodegrade dyes that would otherwise take a long time to naturally break down. It also has been found to have the ability to perform keratin hydrolysis through the production of keratinases.

- Kocuria rosea* strain DBUPL4, isolated from soil in the Guassa Community Conservation Area (GCCA) in Ethiopia, demonstrated extracellular amylase production. On starch agar it produced a clear hydrolysis halo of approximately 15 mm following iodine flooding, indicating active starch degradation.

Multiple strains of K. rosea have been reported to grow poorly or be inhibited on Simmons’ citrate agar, likely due to an interaction with the bromothymol blue pH indicator.

== Stress tolerance ==
Growth studies on Kocuria rosea strain DBUPL4 showed optimal proliferation between 25–30 °C, with peak growth at 30 °C and markedly reduced growth above 40 °C. Other studies report a broader temperature growth window ranging from 25–37 °C depending on strain variation.

An environmental isolate, K. rosea strain MG2, was recovered from a naturally radioactive alkaline hot spring and exhibited tolerance to multiple physical and chemical stresses. This strain grew optimally at approximately pH 9.2, survived up to 15% NaCl, resisted UV-C irradiation at intensities normally lethal to most non-extremophilic bacteria, tolerated oxidative stress, and maintained viability after 28-day desiccation. These properties indicate that some K. rosea strains may possess polyextremotolerance, a trait common among many Actinobacteria.

Certain strains of K. rosea (including strains 394 and 397) have been reported to carry an RM gene strongly homologous to rifampicin-resistance determinants, suggesting potential rifampicin resistance.
