= Rothia kristinae =

Scientific classification
- Domain: Bacteria
- Kingdom: Bacillati
- Phylum: Actinomycetota
- Class: Actinomycetes
- Order: Micrococcales
- Family: Micrococcaceae
- Genus: Rothia
- Species: R. kristinae

Binomial name
- Rothia kristinae (Kloos et al. 1974) Nouioui et al. 2018

Type strain
- ATCC 27570; CCM 2690; CCUG 33026; CIP 81.69; DSM 20032; IEGM 390; IFO 15354; JCM 7237; LMG 14215; NBRC 15354; NCTC 11038; NRRL B-14835; VKM B-1811

Synonyms
- Micrococcus kristinae Kloos et al. 1974 (Approved Lists 1980); Kocuria kristinae (Kloos et al. 1974) Stackebrandt et al. 1995

Species of bacterium

Rothia kristinae is a Gram positive bacterium. R. kristinae is a common human skin organism, but can cause opportunistic infections in humans.

== Background ==
In 1974, a novel bacterium was isolated from the skin of a healthy adult woman. The novel species was originally named Micrococcus kristinae, and was named after the person from which it was first isolated (Kristin Holding). (Micrococcus lylae was also first isolated during the same study) In 1995, the species was reclassified into the genus Kocuria as Kocuria kristinae. In 2018, further studies reclassified the species into genus Rothia as Rothia kristinae.

R. kristinae is Gram-positive, and the cells are coccoid which tend to group together as tetrads. It is slightly facultatively anaerobic, and forms pale cream to pale orange colonies when grown on agar. The optimum growth range is 25–37 °C, and is resistant to lysozyme.

R. kristinae is a common skin and oral microorganism in humans. However, it can cause opportunistic infections for the immunocompromised.
