= Neisseria cinerea =

Scientific classification
- Domain: Bacteria
- Kingdom: Pseudomonadati
- Phylum: Pseudomonadota
- Class: Betaproteobacteria
- Order: Neisseriales
- Family: Neisseriaceae
- Genus: Neisseria
- Species: N. cinerea

Binomial name
- Neisseria cinerea Knapp at al. 1984

Species of bacterium

Neisseria cinerea is a commensal species grouped with the Gram-negative, oxidase-positive, and catalase-positive diplococci. It was first classified as Micrococcus cinereus by Alexander von Lingelsheim in 1906. Using DNA hybridization, N. cinerea exhibits 50% similarity to Neisseria gonorrhoeae.

== Classification ==
Neisseria cinerea has been formerly classified as many other organisms, including Moraxella catarrhalis and Neisseria pseudocatarrhalis. It is often mistaken for Neisseria gonorrhoeae with which it shares morphological and biochemical traits. Both are isolated from similar infections, including endocervical and rectal infections, neonatal conjunctivitis, and lymphadenitis. N. cinerea has even been isolated on gonococcal selective media specifically made to isolate Neisseria gonorrhoeae.

== Colony morphology ==
One important difference between N. cinerea and N. gonorrhoeae is that N. cinerea is slightly more pigmented and exhibits a golden-brown rather than a pinkish-brown pigmentation. The average diameter of N. cinerea colonies varies, but stays around 1–2 mm. The colonies are convex, translucent, and glistening. No change occurs in the color of the media used to isolate N. cinerea before or after staining with Lugol's iodine.

== Biochemical processes ==
Neisseria cinerea can produce acid from glucose like N. gonorrhoeae, but it will then oxidize the acid to carbon dioxide. Although it can break down glucose, it is unable to use glucose or other carbohydrates for energy, making it asaccharolytic. In addition, N. cinerea will react in coagglutination serologic tests and, like N. gonorrhoeae, it produces the enzyme hydroxyprolylaminopeptidase.N. cinerea does not reduce nitrate, but it does reduce nitrite. Proline, arginine, cystine, and cysteine are required for its growth. N. cinerea does not react with antigonococcal protein I monoclonal antibodies and does not produce immunoglobulin A protease, unlike N. gonorrhoeae. Also unlike N. gonorrhoeae, N. cinerea is not resistant to the antibiotic colistin, and it can grow on Mueller–Hinton agar and trypticase soy agar.

== Disease ==
Neisseria cinerea is classified as a nonpathogenic bacterium, but has been isolated from numerous infections including acute meningitis. Many studies indicate that N. cinerea colonizes the oropharynx and sometimes the genital tract. A few infections which could possibly be caused by N. cinerea have been reported. However, in each case, the organism was misidentified as N. flavescens, N. gonorrhoeae, or M. catarrhalis.

== See also ==
- Sexually transmitted disease
