= Neisseria elongata =

Scientific classification
- Domain: Bacteria
- Kingdom: Pseudomonadati
- Phylum: Pseudomonadota
- Class: Betaproteobacteria
- Order: Neisseriales
- Family: Neisseriaceae
- Genus: Neisseria
- Species: N. elongata

Binomial name
- Neisseria elongata Bovre and Holten, 1970

Species of bacterium

Neisseria elongata is a Gram negative bacterium and is different from the other cocci shaped members of the genus Neisseria as it is rod shaped. Unlike other Neisseria it is catalase negative. N. elongata is the most ancestral of the human Neisseria.
