= Neisseria mucosa =

Scientific classification
- Domain: Bacteria
- Kingdom: Pseudomonadati
- Phylum: Pseudomonadota
- Class: Betaproteobacteria
- Order: Neisseriales
- Family: Neisseriaceae
- Genus: Neisseria
- Species: N. mucosa

Binomial name
- Neisseria mucosa Veron et al. 1959

Species of bacterium

Neisseria mucosa is a species of Neisseria.

It is notable among Neisseria for its ability to metabolize sucrose. It can cause endocarditis. While N. mucosa is a rather rare cause of endocarditis, cases of N. mucosa endocarditis have been reported along with symptoms such as painful finger nodules, fever, headache, and tremors. In certain cases, patients can become terminal from this strain of the infection but for those that survive, treatment of N. mucosa endocarditis usually takes around 6 weeks.

== See also ==
- Cystine tryptic agar
