= Neisseria subflava =

Scientific classification
- Domain: Bacteria
- Kingdom: Pseudomonadati
- Phylum: Pseudomonadota
- Class: Betaproteobacteria
- Order: Neisseriales
- Family: Neisseriaceae
- Genus: Neisseria
- Species: N. subflava

Binomial name
- Neisseria subflava (Flügge, 1886) Trevisan, 1889

Species of bacterium

Neisseria subflava is a common inhabitant found in the human upper respiratory tract. It is a gram-negative diplococcus. It produces a positive result of blue when put through the oxidase test. It is considered non-pathogenic, although in rare case it can be the causative agent of postoperative meningitis (after a neurological surgery), which is called surgical site infection (SSI).
