= Trypticase soy agar =

Culture medium used in microbiology

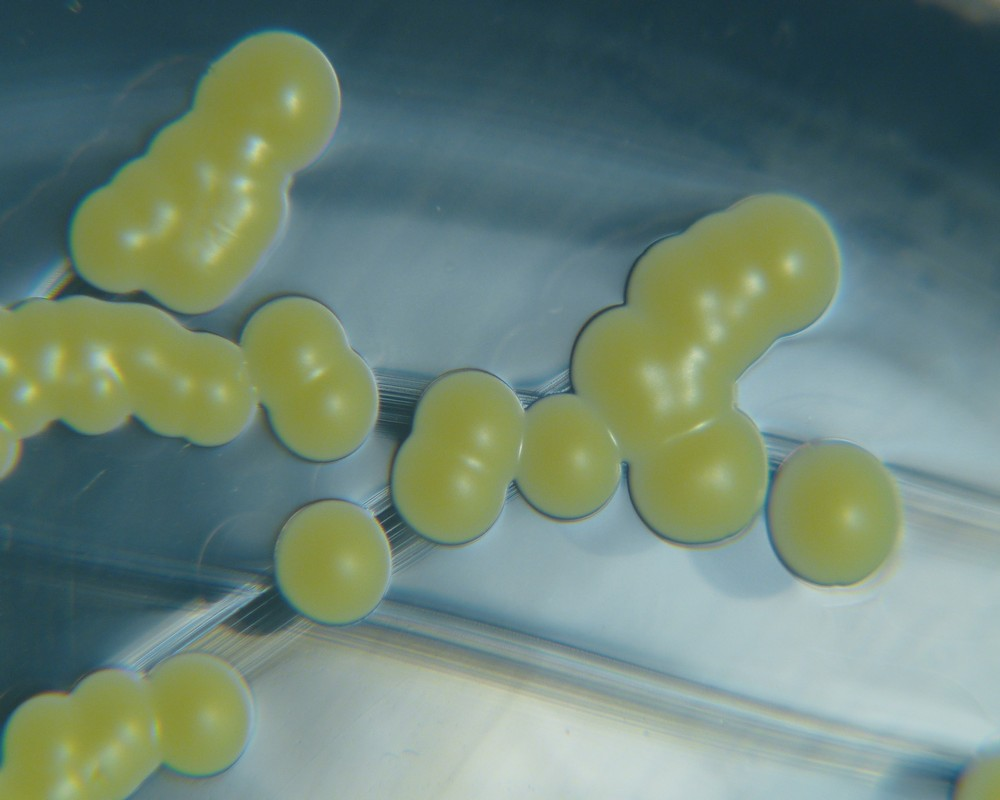
Colonies of Micrococcus luteus on Tryptic Soy Agar. Cultivated for 48 hours at 37°C.

Trypticase soy agar or Tryptic soy agar (TSA) is a growth media for the culturing of moderately to non fastidious bacteria. It is a general-purpose, non-selective media providing enough nutrients to allow for a wide variety of microorganisms to grow. It is used for a wide range of applications, including culture storage, enumeration of cells (counting), isolation of pure cultures, or simply general culture.

TSA contains enzymatic digests of casein and soybean meal, which provide amino acids and other nitrogenous substances, making it a nutritious medium for a variety of organisms. Sodium chloride maintains the osmotic equilibrium, while dipotassium phosphate acts as buffer to maintain pH. Agar extracted from any number of organisms is used as a gelling agent.

One liter of the agar contains:

- 15 g pancreatic digest of casein
- 5 g soy peptone
- 5 g sodium chloride
- 15 g agar

== Uses ==
The medium may be supplemented with blood to facilitate the growth of more fastidious bacteria or can be made selective for fungi by addition of antibiotics such as chloramphenicol. As with any media, minor changes may be made to suit specific circumstances. TSA is frequently the base medium of other agar plate types. For example, blood agar plates (BAP) are made by enriching TSA plates with defibrinated sheep blood, and chocolate agar is made through additional cooking of BAP.
