= Neisseria sicca =

Scientific classification
- Domain: Bacteria
- Kingdom: Pseudomonadati
- Phylum: Pseudomonadota
- Class: Betaproteobacteria
- Order: Neisseriales
- Family: Neisseriaceae
- Genus: Neisseria
- Species: N. sicca

Binomial name
- Neisseria sicca von Lingelsheim, 1908

Species of bacterium

Neisseria sicca is a commensal organism belonging to the genus Neisseria. It is Gram-negative and oxidase-positive. There are multiple strains of this species, some of which are reported to have caused septicaemia in immunocompromised patients. These bacteria are the first among Neisseria species to have been shown to have O-repeat structure in their liposaccharide.
