= Micrococcus luteus =

Scientific classification
- Domain: Bacteria
- Kingdom: Bacillati
- Phylum: Actinomycetota
- Class: Actinomycetes
- Order: Micrococcales
- Family: Micrococcaceae
- Genus: Micrococcus
- Species: M. luteus

Binomial name
- Micrococcus luteus (Schroeter 1872); Cohn 1872

Species of bacterium

Micrococcus luteus is a Gram-positive to Gram-variable, nonmotile, tetrad-arranging, pigmented, saprotrophic coccus bacterium in the family Micrococcaceae. It is urease and catalase positive. An obligate aerobe, and non spore forming. M. luteus is found in soil, dust, water and air, and as part of the normal microbiota of the mammalian skin. The bacterium also colonizes the human mouth, mucosae, oropharynx and upper respiratory tract.

Micrococcus luteus is generally harmless but can become an opportunistic pathogen in immunocompromised people or those with indwelling catheters. It resists antibiotic treatment by slowing of major metabolic processes and induction of unique genes. Its genome has a high G + C content.

Micrococcus luteus is coagulase negative, bacitracin susceptible, and forms bright yellow colonies on nutrient agar (hence its scientific species name luteus which means "yellow" in Latin).

Micrococcus luteus has been shown to survive in oligotrophic environments for extended periods of time. It has survived for at least 34,000 to 170,000 years, as assessed by 16S rRNA analysis, and possibly much longer.

It has been has demonstrated that Micrococcus luteus can enter a viable but nonculturable dormant state in oligotrophic conditions. This dormancy can be reversed using its own resuscitation-promoting factors.

Its genome was sequenced in 2010 and is one of the smallest genomes of free-living Actinomycetota sequenced to date, comprising a single circular chromosome of 2,501,097 bp.

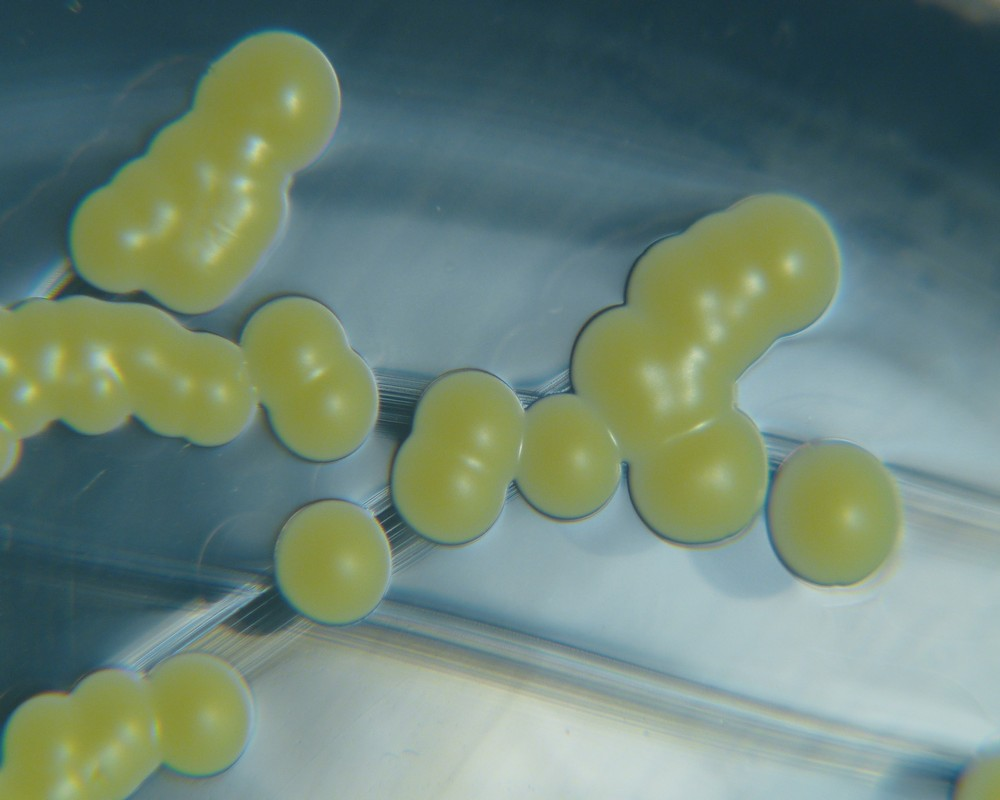
Colonies of Micrococcus luteus on Tryptic Soy Agar. Cultivated for 48 hours at 37°C.

== Novel codon usage ==
Micrococcus luteus was one of the early examples of novel codon usage, which led to the conclusion that the genetic code is not static, but evolves.

== Classification ==
Micrococcus luteus was formerly known as Micrococcus lysodeikticus.

In 2003, it was proposed that one strain of Micrococcus luteus, ATCC 9341, be reclassified as Kocuria rhizophila.

== Ultraviolet absorption ==
Norwegian researchers in 2013 found a M. luteus strain that synthesizes a pigment that absorbs wavelengths of light from 350 to 475 nanometers. Exposure to these wavelengths of ultraviolet light, UVA, generates reactive oxygen species, which damage DNA. Scientists believe this pigment can be used to make a sunscreen that can protect against ultraviolet light.

== Tests for identification ==
Test	Result
Gram stain	+
Catalase	+
Acid from glucose	(yellow pigment)
Bacitracin	Sensitive
Motility	-
Nitrate reduction	-
Urease	+
