= Neisseria lactamica =

Scientific classification
- Domain: Bacteria
- Kingdom: Pseudomonadati
- Phylum: Pseudomonadota
- Class: Betaproteobacteria
- Order: Neisseriales
- Family: Neisseriaceae
- Genus: Neisseria
- Species: N. lactamica

Binomial name
- Neisseria lactamica corrig. Hollis et al. 1969 (Approved Lists 1980)

Species of bacterium

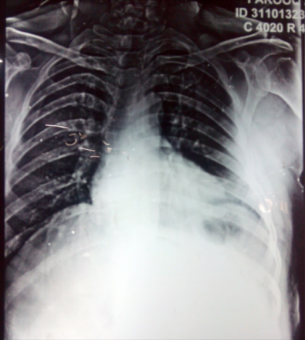
X - ray of a patient suffering from lung cavity caused by N. lactamica

Neisseria lactamica is a gram-negative diplococcus bacterium. It is strictly a commensal species of the nasopharynx. Uniquely among the Neisseria they are able to produce β-D-galactosidase and ferment lactose.

This species is most commonly carried by young children. There is an inverse relationship between colonisation by N. lactamica and Neisseria meningitidis. Carriage of N. lactamica has been associated with decreased incidence of invasive meningococcal disease. However, resistance to penicillin and other beta-lactams may be transmitted from commensal neisseriae such as Neisseria lactamica to disease causing Neisseria meningitidis by the process of genetic transformation.
