= List of MeSH codes (B03) =

Medical Subject Headings

The following is a partial list of the "B" codes for Medical Subject Headings (MeSH), as defined by the United States National Library of Medicine (NLM).

This list continues the information at List of MeSH codes (B02). Codes following these are found at List of MeSH codes (B04). For other MeSH codes, see List of MeSH codes.

The source for this content is the set of 2006 MeSH Trees from the NLM.

== MeSH B03 – bacteria ==
=== MeSH B03.140 – Bacteroidetes ===
==== MeSH B03.140.094 – bacteroidaceae ====
- MeSH B03.140.094.152 – bacteroides
- MeSH B03.140.094.152.400 – Bacteroides fragilis
- MeSH B03.140.094.625 – Porphyromonas
- MeSH B03.140.094.625.350 – Porphyromonas endodontalis
- MeSH B03.140.094.625.515 – Porphyromonas gingivalis
- MeSH B03.140.094.640 – Prevotella
- MeSH B03.140.094.640.375 – Prevotella intermedia
- MeSH B03.140.094.640.500 – Prevotella melaninogenica
- MeSH B03.140.094.640.550 – Prevotella nigrescens
- MeSH B03.140.094.640.700 – Prevotella ruminicola

==== MeSH B03.140.190 – flavobacteriaceae ====
- MeSH B03.140.190.100 – Capnocytophaga
- MeSH B03.140.190.120 – Chryseobacterium
- MeSH B03.140.190.250 – Flavobacterium
- MeSH B03.140.190.600 – Ornithobacterium

==== MeSH B03.140.200 – flexibacteraceae ====
- MeSH B03.140.200.150 – Cytophaga
- MeSH B03.140.200.200 – Flexibacter

=== MeSH B03.280 – "Cyanobacteria" ===
==== MeSH B03.280.100 – Anabaena ====
- MeSH B03.280.100.150 – Anabaena cylindrica
- MeSH B03.280.100.300 – Anabaena flos-aquae
- MeSH B03.280.100.900 – Anabaena variabilis

==== MeSH B03.280.575 – Nostoc ====
- MeSH B03.280.575.150 – Nostoc commune
- MeSH B03.280.575.500 – Nostoc muscorum

=== MeSH B03.300 – endospore-forming bacteria ===
==== MeSH B03.300.390 – gram-positive endospore-forming bacteria ====
- MeSH B03.300.390.400 – gram-positive endospore-forming rods
- MeSH B03.300.390.400.158 – bacillaceae
- MeSH B03.300.390.400.158.218 – Bacillus
- MeSH B03.300.390.400.158.218.151 – Bacillus anthracis
- MeSH B03.300.390.400.158.218.252 – Bacillus cereus
- MeSH B03.300.390.400.158.218.500 – Bacillus megaterium
- MeSH B03.300.390.400.158.218.700 – Bacillus stearothermophilus
- MeSH B03.300.390.400.158.218.725 – Bacillus subtilis
- MeSH B03.300.390.400.158.218.800 – Bacillus thuringiensis
- MeSH B03.300.390.400.200 – Clostridium
- MeSH B03.300.390.400.200.025 – Clostridium acetobutylicum
- MeSH B03.300.390.400.200.100 – Clostridium beijerinckii
- MeSH B03.300.390.400.200.130 – Clostridium bifermentans
- MeSH B03.300.390.400.200.160 – Clostridium botulinum
- MeSH B03.300.390.400.200.160.050 – Clostridium botulinum type A
- MeSH B03.300.390.400.200.160.100 – Clostridium botulinum type B
- MeSH B03.300.390.400.200.160.150 – Clostridium botulinum type C
- MeSH B03.300.390.400.200.160.200 – Clostridium botulinum type D
- MeSH B03.300.390.400.200.160.250 – Clostridium botulinum type E
- MeSH B03.300.390.400.200.160.300 – Clostridium botulinum type F
- MeSH B03.300.390.400.200.160.350 – Clostridium botulinum type G
- MeSH B03.300.390.400.200.180 – Clostridium butyricum
- MeSH B03.300.390.400.200.200 – Clostridium cellulolyticum
- MeSH B03.300.390.400.200.205 – Clostridium cellulovorans
- MeSH B03.300.390.400.200.215 – Clostridium chauvoei
- MeSH B03.300.390.400.200.250 – clostridium difficile
- MeSH B03.300.390.400.200.412 – Clostridium histolyticum
- MeSH B03.300.390.400.200.493 – Clostridium kluyveri
- MeSH B03.300.390.400.200.575 – Clostridium perfringens
- MeSH B03.300.390.400.200.700 – Clostridium sordellii
- MeSH B03.300.390.400.200.710 – Clostridium sticklandii
- MeSH B03.300.390.400.200.713 – Clostridium symbiosum
- MeSH B03.300.390.400.200.722 – Clostridium tertium
- MeSH B03.300.390.400.200.725 – Clostridium tetani
- MeSH B03.300.390.400.200.740 – Clostridium tetanomorphum
- MeSH B03.300.390.400.200.770 – Clostridium thermocellum
- MeSH B03.300.390.400.200.800 – Clostridium tyrobutyricum
- MeSH B03.300.390.400.500 – micromonosporaceae
- MeSH B03.300.390.400.500.500 – Micromonospora
- MeSH B03.300.390.400.790 – Saccharopolyspora
- MeSH B03.300.390.400.810 – streptomycetaceae
- MeSH B03.300.390.400.810.768 – Streptomyces
- MeSH B03.300.390.400.810.768.100 – Streptomyces antibioticus
- MeSH B03.300.390.400.810.768.125 – Streptomyces aureofaciens
- MeSH B03.300.390.400.810.768.200 – Streptomyces coelicolor
- MeSH B03.300.390.400.810.768.375 – Streptomyces griseus
- MeSH B03.300.390.400.810.768.500 – Streptomyces lividans

=== MeSH B03.370 – Fusobacteriota ===
==== MeSH B03.370.250 – Fusobacterium ====
- MeSH B03.370.250.400 – Fusobacterium necrophorum
- MeSH B03.370.250.500 – Fusobacterium nucleatum

=== MeSH B03.440 – gram-negative bacteria ===
==== MeSH B03.440.040 – anaplasmataceae ====
- MeSH B03.440.040.050 – Anaplasma
- MeSH B03.440.040.050.100 – Anaplasma centrale
- MeSH B03.440.040.050.500 – Anaplasma marginale
- MeSH B03.440.040.050.575 – Anaplasma ovis
- MeSH B03.440.040.050.600 – Anaplasma phagocytophilum
- MeSH B03.440.040.287 – Ehrlichia
- MeSH B03.440.040.287.090 – Ehrlichia canis
- MeSH B03.440.040.287.150 – Ehrlichia chaffeensis
- MeSH B03.440.040.287.700 – Ehrlichia ruminantium
- MeSH B03.440.040.525 – Neorickettsia
- MeSH B03.440.040.525.700 – Neorickettsia risticii
- MeSH B03.440.040.525.720 – Neorickettsia sennetsu

==== MeSH B03.440.090 – bartonellaceae ====
- MeSH B03.440.090.100 – Bartonella
- MeSH B03.440.090.100.080 – Bartonella bacilliformis
- MeSH B03.440.090.100.350 – Bartonella henselae
- MeSH B03.440.090.100.650 – Bartonella quintana

==== MeSH B03.440.180 – Campylobacter ====
- MeSH B03.440.180.200 – Campylobacter coli
- MeSH B03.440.180.325 – Campylobacter fetus
- MeSH B03.440.180.375 – Campylobacter hyointestinalis
- MeSH B03.440.180.425 – Campylobacter jejuni
- MeSH B03.440.180.500 – Campylobacter lari
- MeSH B03.440.180.650 – Campylobacter rectus
- MeSH B03.440.180.700 – Campylobacter sputorum
- MeSH B03.440.180.800 – Campylobacter upsaliensis

==== MeSH B03.440.190 – chlamydiales ====
- MeSH B03.440.190.190 – chlamydiaceae
- MeSH B03.440.190.190.190 – Chlamydia
- MeSH B03.440.190.190.190.500 – Chlamydia muridarum
- MeSH B03.440.190.190.190.750 – Chlamydia trachomatis
- MeSH B03.440.190.190.230 – Chlamydophila
- MeSH B03.440.190.190.230.249 – Chlamydophila pneumoniae
- MeSH B03.440.190.190.230.500 – Chlamydophila psittaci

==== MeSH B03.440.400 – gram-negative aerobic bacteria ====
- MeSH B03.440.400.280 – Caulobacter
- MeSH B03.440.400.280.280 – Caulobacter crescentus
- MeSH B03.440.400.400 – gallionellaceae
- MeSH B03.440.400.425 – gram-negative aerobic rods and cocci
- MeSH B03.440.400.425.100 – acetobacteraceae
- MeSH B03.440.400.425.100.100 – Acetobacter
- MeSH B03.440.400.425.100.110 – Acidiphilium
- MeSH B03.440.400.425.100.550 – Gluconobacter
- MeSH B03.440.400.425.100.550.550 – Gluconobacter oxydans
- MeSH B03.440.400.425.103 – Acidithiobacillus
- MeSH B03.440.400.425.103.800 – Acidithiobacillus thiooxidans
- MeSH B03.440.400.425.110 – Afipia
- MeSH B03.440.400.425.117 – alcaligenaceae
- MeSH B03.440.400.425.117.024 – Achromobacter
- MeSH B03.440.400.425.117.024.100 – Achromobacter cycloclastes
- MeSH B03.440.400.425.117.024.120 – Achromobacter denitrificans
- MeSH B03.440.400.425.117.050 – Alcaligenes
- MeSH B03.440.400.425.117.050.200 – Alcaligenes faecalis
- MeSH B03.440.400.425.117.075 – Bordetella
- MeSH B03.440.400.425.117.075.099 – Bordetella avium
- MeSH B03.440.400.425.117.075.200 – Bordetella bronchiseptica
- MeSH B03.440.400.425.117.075.540 – Bordetella parapertussis
- MeSH B03.440.400.425.117.075.550 – Bordetella pertussis
- MeSH B03.440.400.425.117.800 – Taylorella
- MeSH B03.440.400.425.117.800.200 – Taylorella equigenitalis
- MeSH B03.440.400.425.126 – Alteromonas
- MeSH B03.440.400.425.127 – Azorhizobium
- MeSH B03.440.400.425.127.100 – Azorhizobium caulinodans
- MeSH B03.440.400.425.135 – azotobacteraceae
- MeSH B03.440.400.425.135.135 – Azotobacter
- MeSH B03.440.400.425.135.135.850 – Azotobacter vinelandii
- MeSH B03.440.400.425.180 – Bdellovibrio
- MeSH B03.440.400.425.200 – Nitrobacteraceae
- MeSH B03.440.400.425.200.040 – Afipia
- MeSH B03.440.400.425.200.090 – Bradyrhizobium
- MeSH B03.440.400.425.200.520 – Nitrobacter
- MeSH B03.440.400.425.200.700 – Rhodopseudomonas
- MeSH B03.440.400.425.205 – Bradyrhizobium
- MeSH B03.440.400.425.215 – brucellaceae
- MeSH B03.440.400.425.215.500 – Brucella
- MeSH B03.440.400.425.215.500.100 – Brucella abortus
- MeSH B03.440.400.425.215.500.150 – Brucella canis
- MeSH B03.440.400.425.215.500.500 – Brucella melitensis
- MeSH B03.440.400.425.215.500.625 – Brucella ovis
- MeSH B03.440.400.425.215.500.750 – Brucella suis
- MeSH B03.440.400.425.251 – burkholderiaceae
- MeSH B03.440.400.425.251.100 – Burkholderia
- MeSH B03.440.400.425.251.100.110 – Burkholderia cepacia complex
- MeSH B03.440.400.425.251.100.110.500 – Burkholderia cepacia
- MeSH B03.440.400.425.251.100.355 – Burkholderia gladioli
- MeSH B03.440.400.425.251.100.477 – Burkholderia mallei
- MeSH B03.440.400.425.251.100.600 – Burkholderia pseudomallei
- MeSH B03.440.400.425.288 – Caulobacteraceae
- MeSH B03.440.400.425.288.100 – Caulobacter
- MeSH B03.440.400.425.288.100.100 – Caulobacter crescentus
- MeSH B03.440.400.425.290 – Cellvibrio
- MeSH B03.440.400.425.292 – comamonadaceae
- MeSH B03.440.400.425.292.150 – Comamonas
- MeSH B03.440.400.425.292.150.750 – Comamonas testosteroni
- MeSH B03.440.400.425.292.170 – Delftia
- MeSH B03.440.400.425.292.170.030 – Delftia acidovorans
- MeSH B03.440.400.425.292.500 – eptothrix
- MeSH B03.440.400.425.292.750 – Sphaerotilus
- MeSH B03.440.400.425.297 – Coxiellaceae
- MeSH B03.440.400.425.297.150 – coxiella
- MeSH B03.440.400.425.297.150.100 – Coxiella burnetii
- MeSH B03.440.400.425.310 – flavobacteriaceae
- MeSH B03.440.400.425.310.120 – Chryseobacterium
- MeSH B03.440.400.425.310.250 – Flavobacterium
- MeSH B03.440.400.425.310.600 – Ornithobacterium
- MeSH B03.440.400.425.325 – flexibacteraceae
- MeSH B03.440.400.425.325.150 – Cytophaga
- MeSH B03.440.400.425.325.200 – Flexibacter
- MeSH B03.440.400.425.340 – Francisella
- MeSH B03.440.400.425.340.590 – Fancisella tularensis
- MeSH B03.440.400.425.365 – Gluconacetobacter
- MeSH B03.440.400.425.365.500 – Gluconacetobacter xylinus
- MeSH B03.440.400.425.377 – halomonadaceae
- MeSH B03.440.400.425.377.500 – Halomonas
- MeSH B03.440.400.425.395 – Halothiobacillus
- MeSH B03.440.400.425.450 – legionellaceae
- MeSH B03.440.400.425.450.450 – Legionella
- MeSH B03.440.400.425.450.450.400 – Legionella longbeachae
- MeSH B03.440.400.425.450.450.500 – Legionella pneumophila
- MeSH B03.440.400.425.475 – Leptospiraceae
- MeSH B03.440.400.425.475.475 – Leptospira
- MeSH B03.440.400.425.475.475.400 – Leptospira interrogans
- MeSH B03.440.400.425.475.475.400.050 – Leptospira interrogans serovar australis
- MeSH B03.440.400.425.475.475.400.055 – Leptospira interrogans serovar autumnalis
- MeSH B03.440.400.425.475.475.400.150 – Leptospira interrogans serovar canicola
- MeSH B03.440.400.425.475.475.400.400 – Leptospira interrogans serovar hebdomadis
- MeSH B03.440.400.425.475.475.400.420 – Leptospira interrogans serovar icterohaemorrhagiae
- MeSH B03.440.400.425.475.475.400.650 – Leptospira interrogans serovar pomona
- MeSH B03.440.400.425.487 – methylobacteriaceae
- MeSH B03.440.400.425.487.500 – Methylobacterium
- MeSH B03.440.400.425.487.500.150 – Methylobacterium extorquens
- MeSH B03.440.400.425.500 – methylococcaceae
- MeSH B03.440.400.425.500.500 – Methylococcus
- MeSH B03.440.400.425.500.500.100 – Methylococcus capsulatus
- MeSH B03.440.400.425.500.505 – Methylomonas
- MeSH B03.440.400.425.525 – methylophilaceae
- MeSH B03.440.400.425.525.500 – Methylobacillus
- MeSH B03.440.400.425.525.520 – Methylophilus
- MeSH B03.440.400.425.525.520.500 – Methylophilus methylotrophus
- MeSH B03.440.400.425.537 – moraxellaceae
- MeSH B03.440.400.425.537.050 – Acinetobacter
- MeSH B03.440.400.425.537.050.099 – Acinetobacter baumannii
- MeSH B03.440.400.425.537.050.200 – Acinetobacter calcoaceticus
- MeSH B03.440.400.425.537.525 – Moraxella
- MeSH B03.440.400.425.537.525.200 – Moraxella (Branhamella) catarrhalis
- MeSH B03.440.400.425.537.525.500 – Moraxella (Moraxella) bovis
- MeSH B03.440.400.425.537.650 – Psychrobacter
- MeSH B03.440.400.425.550 – Neisseriaceae
- MeSH B03.440.400.425.550.400 – Kingella
- MeSH B03.440.400.425.550.400.375 – Kingella kingae
- MeSH B03.440.400.425.550.550 – Neisseria
- MeSH B03.440.400.425.550.550.125 – Neisseria cinerea
- MeSH B03.440.400.425.550.550.299 – Neisseria elongata
- MeSH B03.440.400.425.550.550.474 – Neisseria gonorrhoeae
- MeSH B03.440.400.425.550.550.600 – Neisseria lactamica
- MeSH B03.440.400.425.550.550.641 – Neisseria meningitidis
- MeSH B03.440.400.425.550.550.641.700 – Neisseria meningitidis, serogroup A
- MeSH B03.440.400.425.550.550.641.710 – Neisseria meningitidis, serogroup B
- MeSH B03.440.400.425.550.550.641.720 – Neisseria meningitidis, serogroup X
- MeSH B03.440.400.425.550.550.641.800 – Neisseria meningitidis, serogroup W-135
- MeSH B03.440.400.425.550.550.641.820 – Neisseria meningitidis, serogroup Y
- MeSH B03.440.400.425.550.550.660 – Neisseria mucosa
- MeSH B03.440.400.425.550.550.800 – Neisseria sicca
- MeSH B03.440.400.425.562 – nitrosomonadaceae
- MeSH B03.440.400.425.562.500 – Nitrosomonas
- MeSH B03.440.400.425.562.500.200 – Nitrosomonas europaea
- MeSH B03.440.400.425.575 – Ochrobactrum
- MeSH B03.440.400.425.575.650 – Ochrobactrum anthropi
- MeSH B03.440.400.425.587 – oxalobacteraceae
- MeSH B03.440.400.425.587.400 – Herbaspirillum
- MeSH B03.440.400.425.600 – Paracoccus
- MeSH B03.440.400.425.600.380 – Paracoccus denitrificans
- MeSH B03.440.400.425.600.690 – Paracoccus pantotrophus
- MeSH B03.440.400.425.622 – Pseudoalteromonas
- MeSH B03.440.400.425.625 – Pseudomonadaceae
- MeSH B03.440.400.425.625.625 – Pseudomonas
- MeSH B03.440.400.425.625.625.100 – Pseudomonas aeruginosa
- MeSH B03.440.400.425.625.625.120 – Pseudomonas alcaligenes
- MeSH B03.440.400.425.625.625.325 – Pseudomonas fluorescens
- MeSH B03.440.400.425.625.625.350 – Pseudomonas fragi
- MeSH B03.440.400.425.625.625.500 – Pseudomonas mendocina
- MeSH B03.440.400.425.625.625.650 – Pseudomonas oleovorans
- MeSH B03.440.400.425.625.625.662 – Pseudomonas pseudoalcaligenes
- MeSH B03.440.400.425.625.625.675 – Pseudomonas putida
- MeSH B03.440.400.425.625.625.750 – Pseudomonas stutzeri
- MeSH B03.440.400.425.625.625.770 – Pseudomonas syringae
- MeSH B03.440.400.425.687 – ralstoniaceae
- MeSH B03.440.400.425.687.650 – Ralstonia
- MeSH B03.440.400.425.687.650.600 – Ralstonia pickettii
- MeSH B03.440.400.425.687.650.750 – Ralstonia solanacearum
- MeSH B03.440.400.425.687.900 – Wautersia
- MeSH B03.440.400.425.687.900.250 – Wautersia eutropha
- MeSH B03.440.400.425.700 – rhizobiaceae
- MeSH B03.440.400.425.700.800 – Rhizobium
- MeSH B03.440.400.425.700.800.337 – Rhizobium etli
- MeSH B03.440.400.425.700.800.450 – Rhizobium leguminosarum
- MeSH B03.440.400.425.700.800.600 – Rhizobium phaseoli
- MeSH B03.440.400.425.700.800.700 – Rhizobium radiobacter
- MeSH B03.440.400.425.700.800.800 – Rhizobium tropici
- MeSH B03.440.400.425.700.887 – Sinorhizobium
- MeSH B03.440.400.425.700.887.249 – Sinorhizobium fredii
- MeSH B03.440.400.425.700.887.500 – Sinorhizobium meliloti
- MeSH B03.440.400.425.708 – rhodospirillaceae
- MeSH B03.440.400.425.708.100 – Azospirillum
- MeSH B03.440.400.425.708.100.020 – Azospirillum brasilense
- MeSH B03.440.400.425.708.100.510 – Azospirillum lipoferum
- MeSH B03.440.400.425.708.500 – Magnetospirillum
- MeSH B03.440.400.425.708.733 – Rhodospirillum
- MeSH B03.440.400.425.708.733.150 – Rhodospirillum centenum
- MeSH B03.440.400.425.708.733.650 – Rhodospirillum rubrum
- MeSH B03.440.400.425.710 – Rhodothermus
- MeSH B03.440.400.425.745 – Sphingobacterium
- MeSH B03.440.400.425.750 – Sphingomonas
- MeSH B03.440.400.425.875 – Thermus
- MeSH B03.440.400.425.875.875 – Thermus thermophilus
- MeSH B03.440.400.425.935 – Xanthobacter
- MeSH B03.440.400.425.967 – xanthomonadaceae
- MeSH B03.440.400.425.967.750 – Stenotrophomonas
- MeSH B03.440.400.425.967.750.500 – Stenotrophomonas maltophilia
- MeSH B03.440.400.425.967.930 – Xanthomonas
- MeSH B03.440.400.425.967.930.100 – Xanthomonas campestris
- MeSH B03.440.400.425.967.930.850 – Xanthomonas vesicatoria
- MeSH B03.440.400.425.967.950 – Xylella
- MeSH B03.440.400.425.983 – Zoogloea
- MeSH B03.440.400.450 – gram-negative chemolithotrophic bacteria
- MeSH B03.440.400.450.800 – Thiobacillus
- MeSH B03.440.400.645 – Thiotrichaceae
- MeSH B03.440.400.840 – Vitreoscilla

==== MeSH B03.440.425 – gram-negative anaerobic bacteria ====
- MeSH B03.440.425.400 – gram-negative anaerobic cocci
- MeSH B03.440.425.400.500 – Megasphaera
- MeSH B03.440.425.400.750 – Thiocapsa
- MeSH B03.440.425.400.750.660 – Thiocapsa roseopersicina
- MeSH B03.440.425.410 – gram-negative anaerobic straight, curved, and helical rods
- MeSH B03.440.425.410.096 – acidaminococcaceae
- MeSH B03.440.425.410.096.020 – Acidaminococcus
- MeSH B03.440.425.410.096.755 – Pectinatus
- MeSH B03.440.425.410.096.877 – Selenomonas
- MeSH B03.440.425.410.096.938 – Veillonella
- MeSH B03.440.425.410.145 – Anaerobiospirillum
- MeSH B03.440.425.410.194 – bacteroidaceae
- MeSH B03.440.425.410.194.152 – Bacteroides
- MeSH B03.440.425.410.194.152.400 – Bacteroides fragilis
- MeSH B03.440.425.410.194.625 – Porphyromonas
- MeSH B03.440.425.410.194.625.350 – Porphyromonas endodontalis
- MeSH B03.440.425.410.194.625.515 – Porphyromonas gingivalis
- MeSH B03.440.425.410.194.640 – Prevotella
- MeSH B03.440.425.410.194.640.375 – Prevotella intermedia
- MeSH B03.440.425.410.194.640.500 – Prevotella melaninogenica
- MeSH B03.440.425.410.194.640.550 – Prevotella nigrescens
- MeSH B03.440.425.410.194.640.700 – Prevotella ruminicola
- MeSH B03.440.425.410.200 – Bilophila
- MeSH B03.440.425.410.237 – Butyrivibrio
- MeSH B03.440.425.410.275 – Chlorobium
- MeSH B03.440.425.410.290 – Chromatium
- MeSH B03.440.425.410.350 – Desulfovibrio
- MeSH B03.440.425.410.350.040 – Desulfovibrio africanus
- MeSH B03.440.425.410.350.150 – Desulfovibrio desulfuricans
- MeSH B03.440.425.410.350.350 – Desulfovibrio gigas
- MeSH B03.440.425.410.350.875 – Desulfovibrio vulgaris
- MeSH B03.440.425.410.360 – Desulfuromonas
- MeSH B03.440.425.410.400 – Dichelobacter nodosus
- MeSH B03.440.425.410.405 – ectothiorhodospiraceae
- MeSH B03.440.425.410.405.500 – Ectothiorhodospira
- MeSH B03.440.425.410.405.500.720 – Ectothiorhodospira shaposhnikovii
- MeSH B03.440.425.410.405.750 – Halorhodospira halophila
- MeSH B03.440.425.410.410 – Fibrobacter
- MeSH B03.440.425.410.420 – Fusobacterium
- MeSH B03.440.425.410.420.400 – Fusobacterium necrophorum
- MeSH B03.440.425.410.420.500 – Fusobacterium nucleatum
- MeSH B03.440.425.410.430 – Geobacter
- MeSH B03.440.425.410.535 – Leptotrichia
- MeSH B03.440.425.410.580 – Oxalobacter formigenes
- MeSH B03.440.425.410.600 – Propionigenium
- MeSH B03.440.425.410.700 – Selenomonas
- MeSH B03.440.425.410.711 – Spirochaetaceae
- MeSH B03.440.425.410.711.193 – Borrelia
- MeSH B03.440.425.410.711.193.150 – Borrelia burgdorferi group
- MeSH B03.440.425.410.711.193.150.125 – Borrelia burgdorferi
- MeSH B03.440.425.410.711.670 – Serpulina
- MeSH B03.440.425.410.711.670.400 – Serpulina hyodysenteriae
- MeSH B03.440.425.410.711.679 – Spirochaeta
- MeSH B03.440.425.410.711.795 – Treponema
- MeSH B03.440.425.410.711.795.700 – Treponema denticola
- MeSH B03.440.425.410.711.795.840 – Treponema pallidum
- MeSH B03.440.425.410.722 – succinivibrionaceae
- MeSH B03.440.425.410.745 – Thauera
- MeSH B03.440.425.410.750 – Thermotoga maritima
- MeSH B03.440.425.410.760 – Thermotoga neapolitana
- MeSH B03.440.425.410.875 – Wolinella

==== MeSH B03.440.450 – gram-negative facultatively anaerobic rods ====
- MeSH B03.440.450.009 – Actinobacillus
- MeSH B03.440.450.009.050 – Actinobacillus actinomycetemcomitans
- MeSH B03.440.450.009.200 – Actinobacillus equuli
- MeSH B03.440.450.009.580 – Actinobacillus pleuropneumoniae
- MeSH B03.440.450.009.675 – Actinobacillus seminis
- MeSH B03.440.450.009.700 – Actinobacillus suis
- MeSH B03.440.450.019 – aeromonadaceae
- MeSH B03.440.450.019.025 – Aeromonas
- MeSH B03.440.450.019.025.380 – Aeromonas hydrophila
- MeSH B03.440.450.019.025.690 – Aeromonas salmonicida
- MeSH B03.440.450.040 – Azoarcus
- MeSH B03.440.450.340 – Capnocytophaga
- MeSH B03.440.450.342 – cardiobacteriaceae
- MeSH B03.440.450.342.100 – Cardiobacterium
- MeSH B03.440.450.342.550 – Dichelobacter nodosus
- MeSH B03.440.450.360 – Chromobacterium
- MeSH B03.440.450.400 – Eikenella
- MeSH B03.440.450.400.275 – Eikenella corrodens
- MeSH B03.440.450.425 – enterobacteriaceae
- MeSH B03.440.450.425.180 – Calymmatobacterium
- MeSH B03.440.450.425.200 – Citrobacter
- MeSH B03.440.450.425.200.275 – Citrobacter freundii
- MeSH B03.440.450.425.200.475 – Citrobacter koseri
- MeSH B03.440.450.425.200.737 – Citrobacter rodentium
- MeSH B03.440.450.425.260 – Edwardsiella
- MeSH B03.440.450.425.260.340 – Edwardsiella ictaluri
- MeSH B03.440.450.425.260.750 – Edwardsiella tarda
- MeSH B03.440.450.425.275 – Enterobacter
- MeSH B03.440.450.425.275.099 – Enterobacter aerogenes
- MeSH B03.440.450.425.275.200 – Enterobacter cloacae
- MeSH B03.440.450.425.275.700 – Enterobacter sakazakii
- MeSH B03.440.450.425.300 – Erwinia
- MeSH B03.440.450.425.300.050 – Erwinia amylovora
- MeSH B03.440.450.425.325 – Escherichia
- MeSH B03.440.450.425.325.300 – Escherichia coli
- MeSH B03.440.450.425.325.300.149 – Escherichia coli k12
- MeSH B03.440.450.425.325.300.300 – Escherichia coli o157
- MeSH B03.440.450.425.375 – Hafnia
- MeSH B03.440.450.425.375.050 – Hafnia alvei
- MeSH B03.440.450.425.425 – Klebsiella
- MeSH B03.440.450.425.425.580 – Klebsiella oxytoca
- MeSH B03.440.450.425.425.600 – Klebsiella pneumoniae
- MeSH B03.440.450.425.435 – Kluyvera
- MeSH B03.440.450.425.500 – Morganella
- MeSH B03.440.450.425.500.500 – Morganella morganii
- MeSH B03.440.450.425.580 – Pantoea
- MeSH B03.440.450.425.585 – Pectobacterium
- MeSH B03.440.450.425.585.120 – Pectobacterium carotovorum
- MeSH B03.440.450.425.585.150 – Pectobacterium chrysanthemi
- MeSH B03.440.450.425.590 – Photorhabdus
- MeSH B03.440.450.425.595 – Plesiomonas
- MeSH B03.440.450.425.600 – Proteus
- MeSH B03.440.450.425.600.501 – Proteus mirabilis
- MeSH B03.440.450.425.600.650 – Proteus penneri
- MeSH B03.440.450.425.600.800 – Proteus vulgaris
- MeSH B03.440.450.425.670 – Providencia
- MeSH B03.440.450.425.800 – Salmonella
- MeSH B03.440.450.425.800.100 – Salmonella arizonae
- MeSH B03.440.450.425.800.200 – Salmonella enterica
- MeSH B03.440.450.425.800.200.300 – Salmonella enteritidis
- MeSH B03.440.450.425.800.200.600 – Salmonella paratyphi A
- MeSH B03.440.450.425.800.200.700 – Salmonella paratyphi B
- MeSH B03.440.450.425.800.200.750 – Salmonella paratyphi C
- MeSH B03.440.450.425.800.200.800 – Salmonella typhi
- MeSH B03.440.450.425.800.200.825 – Salmonella typhimurium
- MeSH B03.440.450.425.814 – Serratia
- MeSH B03.440.450.425.814.620 – Serratia liquefaciens
- MeSH B03.440.450.425.814.664 – Serratia marcescens
- MeSH B03.440.450.425.850 – Shigella
- MeSH B03.440.450.425.850.175 – Shigella boydii
- MeSH B03.440.450.425.850.350 – Shigella dysenteriae
- MeSH B03.440.450.425.850.450 – Shigella flexneri
- MeSH B03.440.450.425.850.800 – Shigella sonnei
- MeSH B03.440.450.425.887 – Wigglesworthia
- MeSH B03.440.450.425.890 – Xenorhabdus
- MeSH B03.440.450.425.900 – Yersinia
- MeSH B03.440.450.425.900.300 – Yersinia enterocolitica
- MeSH B03.440.450.425.900.600 – Yersinia pestis
- MeSH B03.440.450.425.900.615 – Yersinia pseudotuberculosis
- MeSH B03.440.450.425.900.650 – Yersinia rucker
- MeSH B03.440.450.467 – Gardnerella
- MeSH B03.440.450.467.800 – Gardnerella vaginalis
- MeSH B03.440.450.510 – Moritella
- MeSH B03.440.450.600 – Pasteurellaceae
- MeSH B03.440.450.600.450 – Haemophilus
- MeSH B03.440.450.600.450.125 – Haemophilus ducreyi
- MeSH B03.440.450.600.450.330 – Haemophilus influenzae
- MeSH B03.440.450.600.450.330.150 – Haemophilus influenzae type B
- MeSH B03.440.450.600.450.665 – Haemophilus paragallinarum
- MeSH B03.440.450.600.450.675 – Haemophilus parainfluenzae
- MeSH B03.440.450.600.450.690 – Haemophilus paraphrophilus
- MeSH B03.440.450.600.450.700 – Haemophilus parasuis
- MeSH B03.440.450.600.450.750 – Haemophilus somnus
- MeSH B03.440.450.600.500 – Mannheimia
- MeSH B03.440.450.600.500.500 – Mannheimia haemolytica
- MeSH B03.440.450.600.600 – Pasteurella
- MeSH B03.440.450.600.600.500 – Pasteurella multocida
- MeSH B03.440.450.600.600.650 – Pasteurella pneumotropica
- MeSH B03.440.450.650 – Rahnella
- MeSH B03.440.450.690 – Shewanella
- MeSH B03.440.450.690.590 – Shewanella putrefaciens
- MeSH B03.440.450.700 – Streptobacillus
- MeSH B03.440.450.900 – vibrionaceae
- MeSH B03.440.450.900.604 – Photobacterium
- MeSH B03.440.450.900.859 – Vibrio
- MeSH B03.440.450.900.859.030 – Vibrio alginolyticus
- MeSH B03.440.450.900.859.225 – Vibrio cholerae
- MeSH B03.440.450.900.859.225.075 – Vibrio cholerae non-O1
- MeSH B03.440.450.900.859.225.151 – Vibrio cholerae O1
- MeSH B03.440.450.900.859.225.200 – Vibrio cholerae O139
- MeSH B03.440.450.900.859.300 – Vibrio fischeri
- MeSH B03.440.450.900.859.500 – Vibrio mimicus
- MeSH B03.440.450.900.859.550 – Vibrio parahaemolyticus
- MeSH B03.440.450.900.859.745 – Vibrio salmonicida
- MeSH B03.440.450.900.859.900 – Vibrio vulnificus
- MeSH B03.440.450.980 – Zymomonas

==== MeSH B03.440.475 – gram-negative oxygenic photosynthetic bacteria ====
- MeSH B03.440.475.100 – cyanobacteria
- MeSH B03.440.475.100.100 – Anabaena
- MeSH B03.440.475.100.100.150 – Anabaena cylindrica
- MeSH B03.440.475.100.100.300 – Anabaena flos-aquae
- MeSH B03.440.475.100.100.900 – Anabaena variabilis
- MeSH B03.440.475.100.110 – Aphanizomenon
- MeSH B03.440.475.100.200 – Cyanothece
- MeSH B03.440.475.100.210 – Cylindrospermopsis
- MeSH B03.440.475.100.500 – Microcystis
- MeSH B03.440.475.100.550 – Nodularia
- MeSH B03.440.475.100.575 — Nostoc
- MeSH B03.440.475.100.575.150 – Nostoc commune
- MeSH B03.440.475.100.575.500 – Nostoc muscorum
- MeSH B03.440.475.100.650 – Plectonema
- MeSH B03.440.475.100.655 – Prochlorophytes
- MeSH B03.440.475.100.655.600 – Prochlorococcus
- MeSH B03.440.475.100.655.620 – Prochloron
- MeSH B03.440.475.100.655.640 – Prochlorothrix
- MeSH B03.440.475.100.745 – Synechococcus
- MeSH B03.440.475.100.750 – Synechocystis

==== MeSH B03.440.500 – Helicobacter ====
- MeSH B03.440.500.250 – Helicobacter felis
- MeSH B03.440.500.350 – Helicobacter heilmannii
- MeSH B03.440.500.362 – Helicobacter hepaticus
- MeSH B03.440.500.450 – Helicobacter mustelae
- MeSH B03.440.500.550 – Helicobacter pylori

==== MeSH B03.440.540 – Methylosinus ====
- MeSH B03.440.540.500 – Methylosinus trichosporium

==== MeSH B03.440.560 – mollicutes ====
- MeSH B03.440.560.074 – acholeplasmataceae
- MeSH B03.440.560.074.150 – Acholeplasma
- MeSH B03.440.560.074.150.500 – Acholeplasma laidlawii
- MeSH B03.440.560.074.575 – Phytoplasma
- MeSH B03.440.560.112 – Entomoplasmataceae
- MeSH B03.440.560.365 – Erysipelothrix
- MeSH B03.440.560.580 – mycoplasmatales
- MeSH B03.440.560.580.553 – mycoplasmataceae
- MeSH B03.440.560.580.553.553 – Mycoplasma
- MeSH B03.440.560.580.553.553.050 – Mycoplasma agalactiae
- MeSH B03.440.560.580.553.553.075 – Mycoplasma arthritidis
- MeSH B03.440.560.580.553.553.195 – Mycoplasma bovigenitalium
- MeSH B03.440.560.580.553.553.200 – Mycoplasma bovis
- MeSH B03.440.560.580.553.553.210 – Mycoplasma capricolum
- MeSH B03.440.560.580.553.553.220 – Mycoplasma conjunctivae
- MeSH B03.440.560.580.553.553.267 – Mycoplasma dispar
- MeSH B03.440.560.580.553.553.315 – Mycoplasma fermentans
- MeSH B03.440.560.580.553.553.345 – Mycoplasma gallisepticum
- MeSH B03.440.560.580.553.553.355 – Mycoplasma genitalium
- MeSH B03.440.560.580.553.553.400 – Mycoplasma hominis
- MeSH B03.440.560.580.553.553.420 – Mycoplasma hyopneumoniae
- MeSH B03.440.560.580.553.553.425 – Mycoplasma hyorhinis
- MeSH B03.440.560.580.553.553.430 – Mycoplasma hyosynoviae
- MeSH B03.440.560.580.553.553.450 – Mycoplasma iowae
- MeSH B03.440.560.580.553.553.570 – Mycoplasma meleagridis
- MeSH B03.440.560.580.553.553.585 – Mycoplasma mycoides
- MeSH B03.440.560.580.553.553.630 – Mycoplasma orale
- MeSH B03.440.560.580.553.553.635 – Mycoplasma ovipneumoniae
- MeSH B03.440.560.580.553.553.645 – Mycoplasma penetrans
- MeSH B03.440.560.580.553.553.650 – Mycoplasma pneumoniae
- MeSH B03.440.560.580.553.553.670 – Mycoplasma pulmonis
- MeSH B03.440.560.580.553.553.720 – Mycoplasma salivarium
- MeSH B03.440.560.580.553.553.770 – Mycoplasma synoviae
- MeSH B03.440.560.580.553.900 – Ureaplasma
- MeSH B03.440.560.580.553.900.800 – Ureaplasma urealyticum
- MeSH B03.440.560.895 – spiroplasmataceae
- MeSH B03.440.560.895.625 – Spiroplasma
- MeSH B03.440.560.895.625.500 – Spiroplasma citri

==== MeSH B03.440.623 – Rhodobacter ====
- MeSH B03.440.623.225 – Rhodobacter capsulatus
- MeSH B03.440.623.700 – Rhodobacter sphaeroides

==== MeSH B03.440.647 – rickettsiaceae ====
- MeSH B03.440.647.650 – rickettsieae
- MeSH B03.440.647.650.550 – Orientia tsutsugamushi
- MeSH B03.440.647.650.650 – Rickettsia
- MeSH B03.440.647.650.650.040 – Rickettsia akari
- MeSH B03.440.647.650.650.125 – Rickettsia conorii
- MeSH B03.440.647.650.650.362 – Rickettsia felis
- MeSH B03.440.647.650.650.600 – Rickettsia prowazekii
- MeSH B03.440.647.650.650.650 – Rickettsia rickettsii
- MeSH B03.440.647.650.650.810 – Rickettsia typhi
- MeSH B03.440.647.825 – Wolbachia

==== MeSH B03.440.840 – spirillaceae ====
- MeSH B03.440.840.750 – Spirillum

=== MeSH B03.510 – gram-positive bacteria ===
==== MeSH B03.510.024 – Actinomycetota ====
- MeSH B03.510.024.049 – actinomycetales
- MeSH B03.510.024.049.050 – actinomycetaceae
- MeSH B03.510.024.049.050.050 – Actinomyces
- MeSH B03.510.024.049.050.050.050 – Actinomyces viscosus
- MeSH B03.510.024.049.050.525 – Mobiluncus
- MeSH B03.510.024.049.100 – Brevibacterium
- MeSH B03.510.024.049.150 – Cellulomonas
- MeSH B03.510.024.049.180 – Corynebacterium
- MeSH B03.510.024.049.180.100 – Brevibacterium flavum
- MeSH B03.510.024.049.180.150 – Corynebacterium diphtheriae
- MeSH B03.510.024.049.180.300 – Corynebacterium glutamicum
- MeSH B03.510.024.049.180.600 – Corynebacterium pseudotuberculosis
- MeSH B03.510.024.049.180.625 – Corynebacterium pyogenes
- MeSH B03.510.024.049.250 – Frankia
- MeSH B03.510.024.049.300 – Gordonia bacterium
- MeSH B03.510.024.049.475 – micrococcaceae
- MeSH B03.510.024.049.475.050 – Arthrobacter
- MeSH B03.510.024.049.475.500 – Micrococcus
- MeSH B03.510.024.049.475.500.500 – Micrococcus luteus
- MeSH B03.510.024.049.500 – micromonosporaceae
- MeSH B03.510.024.049.500.500 – Micromonospora
- MeSH B03.510.024.049.525 – mycobacteriaceae
- MeSH B03.510.024.049.525.500 – Mycobacterium
- MeSH B03.510.024.049.525.500.250 – mycobacteria, atypical
- MeSH B03.510.024.049.525.500.250.100 – Mycobacterium avium complex
- MeSH B03.510.024.049.525.500.250.225 – Mycobacterium chelonae
- MeSH B03.510.024.049.525.500.250.325 – Mycobacterium fortuitum
- MeSH B03.510.024.049.525.500.250.400 – Mycobacterium kansasii
- MeSH B03.510.024.049.525.500.250.500 – Mycobacterium marinum
- MeSH B03.510.024.049.525.500.250.625 – Mycobacterium scrofulaceum
- MeSH B03.510.024.049.525.500.250.662 – Mycobacterium smegmatis
- MeSH B03.510.024.049.525.500.250.700 – Mycobacterium ulcerans
- MeSH B03.510.024.049.525.500.250.950 – Mycobacterium xenopi
- MeSH B03.510.024.049.525.500.300 – Mycobacterium avium
- MeSH B03.510.024.049.525.500.402 – Mycobacterium bovis
- MeSH B03.510.024.049.525.500.480 – Mycobacterium haemophilum
- MeSH B03.510.024.049.525.500.502 – Mycobacterium leprae
- MeSH B03.510.024.049.525.500.602 – Mycobacterium lepraemurium
- MeSH B03.510.024.049.525.500.630 – Mycobacterium paratuberculosis
- MeSH B03.510.024.049.525.500.640 – Mycobacterium phlei
- MeSH B03.510.024.049.525.500.702 – Mycobacterium tuberculosis
- MeSH B03.510.024.049.537 – nocardiaceae
- MeSH B03.510.024.049.537.550 – Nocardia
- MeSH B03.510.024.049.537.550.550 – Nocardia asteroides
- MeSH B03.510.024.049.537.775 – Rhodococcus
- MeSH B03.510.024.049.537.775.700 – Rhodococcus equi
- MeSH B03.510.024.049.600 – propionibacteriaceae
- MeSH B03.510.024.049.600.600 – Propionibacterium
- MeSH B03.510.024.049.600.600.600 – Propionibacterium acnes
- MeSH B03.510.024.049.750 – Saccharopolyspora
- MeSH B03.510.024.049.775 – Streptomycetaceae
- MeSH B03.510.024.049.775.775 – Streptomyces
- MeSH B03.510.024.049.775.775.100 – Streptomyces antibioticus
- MeSH B03.510.024.049.775.775.125 – Streptomyces aureofaciens
- MeSH B03.510.024.049.775.775.200 – Streptomyces coelicolor
- MeSH B03.510.024.049.775.775.375 – Streptomyces griseus
- MeSH B03.510.024.049.775.775.500 – Streptomyces lividans
- MeSH B03.510.024.100 – Bifidobacterium
- MeSH B03.510.024.400 – Gardnerella
- MeSH B03.510.024.400.800 – Gardnerella vaginalis

==== MeSH B03.510.400 – gram-positive cocci ====
- MeSH B03.510.400.200 – Deinococcus
- MeSH B03.510.400.500 – micrococcaceae
- MeSH B03.510.400.500.500 – Micrococcus
- MeSH B03.510.400.500.500.400 – Micrococcus luteus
- MeSH B03.510.400.562 – peptococcaceae
- MeSH B03.510.400.562.593 – Peptococcus
- MeSH B03.510.400.625 – Peptostreptococcus
- MeSH B03.510.400.687 – Ruminococcus
- MeSH B03.510.400.750 – Sarcina
- MeSH B03.510.400.790 – staphylococcaceae
- MeSH B03.510.400.790.750 – Staphylococcus
- MeSH B03.510.400.790.750.100 – Staphylococcus aureus
- MeSH B03.510.400.790.750.343 – Staphylococcus epidermidis
- MeSH B03.510.400.790.750.400 – Staphylococcus haemolyticus
- MeSH B03.510.400.790.750.425 – Staphylococcus hominis
- MeSH B03.510.400.800 – streptococcaceae
- MeSH B03.510.400.800.280 – Enterococcus
- MeSH B03.510.400.800.280.280 – Enterococcus faecalis
- MeSH B03.510.400.800.280.300 – Enterococcus faecium
- MeSH B03.510.400.800.500 – Lactococcus
- MeSH B03.510.400.800.500.400 – Lactococcus lactis
- MeSH B03.510.400.800.511 – Leuconostoc
- MeSH B03.510.400.800.653 – Pediococcus
- MeSH B03.510.400.800.872 – Streptococcus
- MeSH B03.510.400.800.872.100 – Streptococcus agalactiae
- MeSH B03.510.400.800.872.150 – Streptococcus bovis
- MeSH B03.510.400.800.872.225 – Streptococcus equi
- MeSH B03.510.400.800.872.550 – Streptococcus pneumoniae
- MeSH B03.510.400.800.872.575 – Streptococcus pyogenes
- MeSH B03.510.400.800.872.750 – Streptococcus suis
- MeSH B03.510.400.800.872.800 – Streptococcus thermophilus
- MeSH B03.510.400.800.872.875 – Viridans streptococci
- MeSH B03.510.400.800.872.875.475 – Streptococcus milleri group
- MeSH B03.510.400.800.872.875.475.080 – Streptococcus anginosus
- MeSH B03.510.400.800.872.875.475.150 – Streptococcus constellatus
- MeSH B03.510.400.800.872.875.475.400 – Streptococcus intermedius
- MeSH B03.510.400.800.872.875.500 – Streptococcus mitis
- MeSH B03.510.400.800.872.875.520 – Streptococcus mutans
- MeSH B03.510.400.800.872.875.600 – Streptococcus oralis
- MeSH B03.510.400.800.872.875.700 – Streptococcus sanguis
- MeSH B03.510.400.800.872.875.750 – Streptococcus sobrinus

==== MeSH B03.510.415 – gram-positive endospore-forming bacteria ====
- MeSH B03.510.415.400 – gram-positive endospore-forming rods
- MeSH B03.510.415.400.158 – bacillaceae
- MeSH B03.510.415.400.158.218 – Bacillus
- MeSH B03.510.415.400.158.218.151 – Bacillus anthracis
- MeSH B03.510.415.400.158.218.252 – Bacillus cereus
- MeSH B03.510.415.400.158.218.500 – Bacillus megaterium
- MeSH B03.510.415.400.158.218.700 – Bacillus stearothermophilus
- MeSH B03.510.415.400.158.218.725 – Bacillus subtilis
- MeSH B03.510.415.400.158.218.800 – Bacillus thuringiensis
- MeSH B03.510.415.400.200 – Clostridium
- MeSH B03.510.415.400.200.025 – Clostridium acetobutylicum
- MeSH B03.510.415.400.200.100 – Clostridium beijerinckii
- MeSH B03.510.415.400.200.130 – Clostridium bifermentans
- MeSH B03.510.415.400.200.160 – Clostridium botulinum
- MeSH B03.510.415.400.200.160.050 – Clostridium botulinum type A
- MeSH B03.510.415.400.200.160.100 – Clostridium botulinum type B
- MeSH B03.510.415.400.200.160.150 – Clostridium botulinum type C
- MeSH B03.510.415.400.200.160.200 – Clostridium botulinum type D
- MeSH B03.510.415.400.200.160.250 – Clostridium botulinum type E
- MeSH B03.510.415.400.200.160.300 – Clostridium botulinum type F
- MeSH B03.510.415.400.200.160.350 – Clostridium botulinum type G
- MeSH B03.510.415.400.200.180 – Clostridium butyricum
- MeSH B03.510.415.400.200.200 – Clostridium cellulolyticum
- MeSH B03.510.415.400.200.205 – Clostridium cellulovorans
- MeSH B03.510.415.400.200.215 – Clostridium chauvoei
- MeSH B03.510.415.400.200.250 – Clostridium difficile
- MeSH B03.510.415.400.200.412 – Clostridium histolyticum
- MeSH B03.510.415.400.200.493 – Clostridium kluyveri
- MeSH B03.510.415.400.200.575 – Clostridium perfringens
- MeSH B03.510.415.400.200.700 – Clostridium sordellii
- MeSH B03.510.415.400.200.710 – Clostridium sticklandii
- MeSH B03.510.415.400.200.713 – Clostridium symbiosum
- MeSH B03.510.415.400.200.722 – Clostridium tertium
- MeSH B03.510.415.400.200.725 – Clostridium tetani
- MeSH B03.510.415.400.200.740 – Clostridium tetanomorphum
- MeSH B03.510.415.400.200.770 – Clostridium thermocellum
- MeSH B03.510.415.400.200.800 – Clostridium tyrobutyricum
- MeSH B03.510.415.400.230 – desulfotomaculum
- MeSH B03.510.415.400.500 – micromonosporaceae
- MeSH B03.510.415.400.500.500 – Micromonospora
- MeSH B03.510.415.400.790 – Saccharopolyspora
- MeSH B03.510.415.400.810 – streptomycetaceae
- MeSH B03.510.415.400.810.768 – Streptomyces
- MeSH B03.510.415.400.810.768.100 – Streptomyces antibioticus
- MeSH B03.510.415.400.810.768.125 – Streptomyces aureofaciens
- MeSH B03.510.415.400.810.768.200 – Streptomyces coelicolor
- MeSH B03.510.415.400.810.768.375 – Streptomyces griseus
- MeSH B03.510.415.400.810.768.500 – Streptomyces lividans

==== MeSH B03.510.460 – gram-positive rods ====
- MeSH B03.510.460.400 – gram-positive asporogenous rods
- MeSH B03.510.460.400.400 – gram-positive asporogenous rods, irregular
- MeSH B03.510.460.400.400.024 – Acetobacterium
- MeSH B03.510.460.400.400.049 – Actinomycetota
- MeSH B03.510.460.400.400.049.049 – actinomycetaceae
- MeSH B03.510.460.400.400.049.049.178 – Actinomyces
- MeSH B03.510.460.400.400.049.049.178.800 – Actinomyces viscosus
- MeSH B03.510.460.400.400.049.049.589 – Mobiluncus
- MeSH B03.510.460.400.400.049.074 – Arthrobacter
- MeSH B03.510.460.400.400.049.100 – Bifidobacterium
- MeSH B03.510.460.400.400.049.550 – Brevibacterium
- MeSH B03.510.460.400.400.124 – Butyrivibrio
- MeSH B03.510.460.400.400.200 – Corynebacterium
- MeSH B03.510.460.400.400.200.150 – Corynebacterium diphtheriae
- MeSH B03.510.460.400.400.200.300 – Corynebacterium glutamicum
- MeSH B03.510.460.400.400.200.600 – Corynebacterium pseudotuberculosis
- MeSH B03.510.460.400.400.200.625 – Corynebacterium pyogenes
- MeSH B03.510.460.400.400.250 – Eubacterium
- MeSH B03.510.460.400.400.600 – propionibacteriaceae
- MeSH B03.510.460.400.400.600.600 – Propionibacterium
- MeSH B03.510.460.400.400.600.600.600 – Propionibacterium acnes
- MeSH B03.510.460.400.400.790 – Thermoanaerobacter
- MeSH B03.510.460.400.400.800 – Thermoanaerobacterium
- MeSH B03.510.460.400.410 – gram-positive asporogenous rods, regular
- MeSH B03.510.460.400.410.350 – Erysipelothrix
- MeSH B03.510.460.400.410.475 – lactobacillaceae
- MeSH B03.510.460.400.410.475.475 – Lactobacillus
- MeSH B03.510.460.400.410.475.475.100 – Lactobacillus acidophilus
- MeSH B03.510.460.400.410.475.475.180 – Lactobacillus brevis
- MeSH B03.510.460.400.410.475.475.225 – Lactobacillus casei
- MeSH B03.510.460.400.410.475.475.250 – Lactobacillus delbrueckii
- MeSH B03.510.460.400.410.475.475.325 – Lactobacillus fermentum
- MeSH B03.510.460.400.410.475.475.400 – Lactobacillus helveticus
- MeSH B03.510.460.400.410.475.475.506 – Lactobacillus leichmannii
- MeSH B03.510.460.400.410.475.475.612 – Lactobacillus plantarum
- MeSH B03.510.460.400.410.475.475.680 – Lactobacillus reuteri
- MeSH B03.510.460.400.410.475.475.700 – Lactobacillus rhamnosus
- MeSH B03.510.460.400.410.485 – Listeria
- MeSH B03.510.460.400.410.485.500 – Listeria monocytogenes
- MeSH B03.510.460.400.410.552 – mycobacteriaceae
- MeSH B03.510.460.400.410.552.552 – Mycobacterium
- MeSH B03.510.460.400.410.552.552.250 – mycobacteria, atypical
- MeSH B03.510.460.400.410.552.552.250.100 – Mycobacterium avium complex
- MeSH B03.510.460.400.410.552.552.250.225 – Mycobacterium chelonae
- MeSH B03.510.460.400.410.552.552.250.325 – Mycobacterium fortuitum
- MeSH B03.510.460.400.410.552.552.250.400 – Mycobacterium kansasii
- MeSH B03.510.460.400.410.552.552.250.500 – Mycobacterium marinum
- MeSH B03.510.460.400.410.552.552.250.625 – Mycobacterium scrofulaceum
- MeSH B03.510.460.400.410.552.552.250.662 – Mycobacterium smegmatis
- MeSH B03.510.460.400.410.552.552.250.700 – Mycobacterium ulcerans
- MeSH B03.510.460.400.410.552.552.250.950 – Mycobacterium xenopi
- MeSH B03.510.460.400.410.552.552.300 – Mycobacterium avium
- MeSH B03.510.460.400.410.552.552.402 – Mycobacterium bovis
- MeSH B03.510.460.400.410.552.552.480 – Mycobacterium haemophilum
- MeSH B03.510.460.400.410.552.552.502 – Mycobacterium leprae
- MeSH B03.510.460.400.410.552.552.602 – Mycobacterium lepraemurium
- MeSH B03.510.460.400.410.552.552.630 – Mycobacterium paratuberculosis
- MeSH B03.510.460.400.410.552.552.640 – Mycobacterium phlei
- MeSH B03.510.460.400.410.552.552.702 – Mycobacterium tuberculosis
- MeSH B03.510.460.410 – gram-positive endospore-forming rods
- MeSH B03.510.460.410.158 – bacillaceae
- MeSH B03.510.460.410.158.218 – Bacillus
- MeSH B03.510.460.410.158.218.151 – Bacillus anthracis
- MeSH B03.510.460.410.158.218.252 – Bacillus cereus
- MeSH B03.510.460.410.158.218.500 – Bacillus megaterium
- MeSH B03.510.460.410.158.218.700 – Bacillus stearothermophilus
- MeSH B03.510.460.410.158.218.725 – Bacillus subtilis
- MeSH B03.510.460.410.158.218.800 – Bacillus thuringiensis
- MeSH B03.510.460.410.500 – micromonosporaceae
- MeSH B03.510.460.410.500.500 – Micromonospora
- MeSH B03.510.460.410.790 – Saccharopolyspora
- MeSH B03.510.460.410.810 – streptomycetaceae
- MeSH B03.510.460.410.810.768 – Streptomyces
- MeSH B03.510.460.410.810.768.100 – Streptomyces antibioticus
- MeSH B03.510.460.410.810.768.125 – Streptomyces aureofaciens
- MeSH B03.510.460.410.810.768.200 – Streptomyces coelicolor
- MeSH B03.510.460.410.810.768.375 – Streptomyces griseus
- MeSH B03.510.460.410.810.768.500 – Streptomyces lividans

=== MeSH B03.660 – Pseudomonadota ===
==== MeSH B03.660.050 – Alphaproteobacteria ====
- MeSH B03.660.050.020 – anaplasmataceae
- MeSH B03.660.050.020.050 – Anaplasma
- MeSH B03.660.050.020.050.100 – Anaplasma centrale
- MeSH B03.660.050.020.050.500 – Anaplasma marginale
- MeSH B03.660.050.020.050.575 – Anaplasma ovis
- MeSH B03.660.050.020.050.600 – Anaplasma phagocytophilum
- MeSH B03.660.050.020.287 – Ehrlichia
- MeSH B03.660.050.020.287.090 – Ehrlichia canis
- MeSH B03.660.050.020.287.100 – Ehrlichia chaffeensis
- MeSH B03.660.050.020.287.700 – Ehrlichia ruminantium
- MeSH B03.660.050.020.525 – Neorickettsia
- MeSH B03.660.050.020.525.700 – Neorickettsia risticii
- MeSH B03.660.050.020.525.720 – Neorickettsia sennetsu
- MeSH B03.660.050.030 – bartonellaceae
- MeSH B03.660.050.030.040 – Bartonella
- MeSH B03.660.050.030.040.080 – Bartonella bacilliformis
- MeSH B03.660.050.030.040.350 – Bartonella henselae
- MeSH B03.660.050.030.040.650 – Bartonella quintana
- MeSH B03.660.050.032 – Beijerinckiaceae
- MeSH B03.660.050.035 – Nitrobacteraceae
- MeSH B03.660.050.035.040 – Afipia
- MeSH B03.660.050.035.090 – Bradyrhizobium
- MeSH B03.660.050.035.520 – Nitrobacter
- MeSH B03.660.050.035.700 – Rhodopseudomonas
- MeSH B03.660.050.070 – Brucellaceae
- MeSH B03.660.050.070.100 – Brucella
- MeSH B03.660.050.070.100.100 – Brucella abortus
- MeSH B03.660.050.070.100.150 – Brucella canis
- MeSH B03.660.050.070.100.500 – Brucella melitensis
- MeSH B03.660.050.070.100.625 – Brucella ovis
- MeSH B03.660.050.070.100.750 – Brucella suis
- MeSH B03.660.050.070.700 – Ochrobactrum
- MeSH B03.660.050.070.700.650 – Ochrobactrum anthropi
- MeSH B03.660.050.090 – Caulobacteraceae
- MeSH B03.660.050.090.100 – Caulobacter
- MeSH B03.660.050.090.100.100 – Caulobacter crescentus
- MeSH B03.660.050.340 – Holosporaceae
- MeSH B03.660.050.350 – hyphomicrobiaceae
- MeSH B03.660.050.350.080 – Azorhizobium
- MeSH B03.660.050.350.080.100 – Azorhizobium caulinodans
- MeSH B03.660.050.350.400 – Hyphomicrobium
- MeSH B03.660.050.350.675 – Rhodomicrobium
- MeSH B03.660.050.350.950 – Xanthobacter
- MeSH B03.660.050.500 – methylobacteriaceae
- MeSH B03.660.050.500.500 – Methylobacterium
- MeSH B03.660.050.500.500.150 – Methylobacterium extorquens
- MeSH B03.660.050.512 – Methylocystaceae
- MeSH B03.660.050.512.500 – Methylosinus
- MeSH B03.660.050.512.500.750 – Methylosinus trichosporium
- MeSH B03.660.050.663 – Rhodospirillales
- MeSH B03.660.050.663.050 – acetobacteraceae
- MeSH B03.660.050.663.050.010 – Acetobacter
- MeSH B03.660.050.663.050.020 – Acidiphilium
- MeSH B03.660.050.663.050.400 – Gluconacetobacter
- MeSH B03.660.050.663.050.400.500 – Gluconacetobacter xylinus
- MeSH B03.660.050.663.050.415 – Gluconobacter
- MeSH B03.660.050.663.050.415.550 – Gluconobacter oxydans
- MeSH B03.660.050.663.750 – Rhodospirillaceae
- MeSH B03.660.050.663.750.100 – Azospirillum
- MeSH B03.660.050.663.750.100.020 – Azospirillum brasilense
- MeSH B03.660.050.663.750.100.510 – Azospirillum lipoferum
- MeSH B03.660.050.663.750.500 – Magnetospirillum
- MeSH B03.660.050.663.750.733 – Rhodospirillum
- MeSH B03.660.050.663.750.733.150 – Rhodospirillum centenum
- MeSH B03.660.050.663.750.733.650 – Rhodospirillum rubrum
- MeSH B03.660.050.730 – rhizobiaceae
- MeSH B03.660.050.730.670 – Rhizobium
- MeSH B03.660.050.730.670.337 – Rhizobium etli
- MeSH B03.660.050.730.670.450 – Rhizobium leguminosarum
- MeSH B03.660.050.730.670.600 – Rhizobium phaseoli
- MeSH B03.660.050.730.670.700 – Rhizobium radiobacter
- MeSH B03.660.050.730.670.800 – Rhizobium tropici
- MeSH B03.660.050.730.835 – Sinorhizobium
- MeSH B03.660.050.730.835.399 – Sinorhizobium fredii
- MeSH B03.660.050.730.835.800 – Sinorhizobium meliloti
- MeSH B03.660.050.750 – Rhodobacteraceae
- MeSH B03.660.050.750.600 – Paracoccus
- MeSH B03.660.050.750.600.125 – Paracoccus denitrificans
- MeSH B03.660.050.750.600.600 – Paracoccus pantotrophus
- MeSH B03.660.050.750.700 – Rhodobacter
- MeSH B03.660.050.750.700.225 – Rhodobacter capsulatus
- MeSH B03.660.050.750.700.700 – Rhodobacter sphaeroides
- MeSH B03.660.050.750.725 – Rhodovulum
- MeSH B03.660.050.750.750 – Roseobacter
- MeSH B03.660.050.765 – rickettsiaceae
- MeSH B03.660.050.765.650 – rickettsieae
- MeSH B03.660.050.765.650.600 – Orientia tsutsugamushi
- MeSH B03.660.050.765.650.650 – Rickettsia
- MeSH B03.660.050.765.650.650.040 – Rickettsia akari
- MeSH B03.660.050.765.650.650.180 – Rickettsia conorii
- MeSH B03.660.050.765.650.650.320 – Rickettsia felis
- MeSH B03.660.050.765.650.650.600 – Rickettsia prowazekii
- MeSH B03.660.050.765.650.650.650 – Rickettsia rickettsii
- MeSH B03.660.050.765.650.650.810 – Rickettsia typhi
- MeSH B03.660.050.765.825 – Wolbachia
- MeSH B03.660.050.800 – sphingomonadaceae
- MeSH B03.660.050.800.750 – Sphingomonas
- MeSH B03.660.050.800.990 – Zymomonas

==== MeSH B03.660.075 – Betaproteobacteria ====
- MeSH B03.660.075.027 – alcaligenaceae
- MeSH B03.660.075.027.030 – Achromobacter
- MeSH B03.660.075.027.030.100 – Achromobacter cycloclastes
- MeSH B03.660.075.027.030.120 – Achromobacter denitrificans
- MeSH B03.660.075.027.050 – Alcaligenes
- MeSH B03.660.075.027.050.200 – Alcaligenes faecalis
- MeSH B03.660.075.027.075 – Bordetella
- MeSH B03.660.075.027.075.024 – Bordetella avium
- MeSH B03.660.075.027.075.050 – Bordetella bronchiseptica
- MeSH B03.660.075.027.075.590 – Bordetella parapertussis
- MeSH B03.660.075.027.075.600 – Bordetella pertussis
- MeSH B03.660.075.027.800 – Taylorella
- MeSH B03.660.075.027.800.200 – Taylorella equigenitalis
- MeSH B03.660.075.077 – burkholderiaceae
- MeSH B03.660.075.077.100 – Burkholderia
- MeSH B03.660.075.077.100.110 – Burkholderia cepacia complex
- MeSH B03.660.075.077.100.110.500 – Burkholderia cepacia
- MeSH B03.660.075.077.100.355 – Burkholderia gladioli
- MeSH B03.660.075.077.100.477 – Burkholderia mallei
- MeSH B03.660.075.077.100.600 – Burkholderia pseudomallei
- MeSH B03.660.075.102 – comamonadaceae
- MeSH B03.660.075.102.150 – Comamonas
- MeSH B03.660.075.102.150.750 – Comamonas testosteroni
- MeSH B03.660.075.102.170 – Delftia
- MeSH B03.660.075.102.170.030 – Delftia acidovorans
- MeSH B03.660.075.102.500 – Leptothrix
- MeSH B03.660.075.102.750 – Sphaerotilus
- MeSH B03.660.075.375 – gallionellaceae
- MeSH B03.660.075.400 – hydrogenophilaceae
- MeSH B03.660.075.400.800 – Thiobacillus
- MeSH B03.660.075.495 – methylophilaceae
- MeSH B03.660.075.495.500 – Methylobacillus
- MeSH B03.660.075.495.520 – Methylophilus
- MeSH B03.660.075.495.520.500 – Methylophilus methylotrophus
- MeSH B03.660.075.525 – neisseriaceae
- MeSH B03.660.075.525.100 – Chromobacterium
- MeSH B03.660.075.525.170 – Eikenella
- MeSH B03.660.075.525.170.100 – Eikenella corrodens
- MeSH B03.660.075.525.410 – Kingella
- MeSH B03.660.075.525.410.410 – Kingella kingae
- MeSH B03.660.075.525.520 – Neisseria
- MeSH B03.660.075.525.520.124 – Neisseria cinerea
- MeSH B03.660.075.525.520.262 – Neisseria elongata
- MeSH B03.660.075.525.520.400 – Neisseria gonorrhoeae
- MeSH B03.660.075.525.520.475 – Neisseria lactamica
- MeSH B03.660.075.525.520.500 – Neisseria meningitidis
- MeSH B03.660.075.525.520.500.700 – Neisseria meningitidis, serogroup A
- MeSH B03.660.075.525.520.500.710 – Neisseria meningitidis, serogroup B
- MeSH B03.660.075.525.520.500.720 – Neisseria meningitidis, serogroup C
- MeSH B03.660.075.525.520.500.800 – Neisseria meningitidis, serogroup W-135
- MeSH B03.660.075.525.520.500.820 – Neisseria meningitidis, serogroup Y
- MeSH B03.660.075.525.520.520 – Neisseria mucosa
- MeSH B03.660.075.525.520.760 – Neisseria sicca
- MeSH B03.660.075.525.900 – Vitreoscilla
- MeSH B03.660.075.550 – nitrosomonadaceae
- MeSH B03.660.075.550.500 – Nitrosomonas
- MeSH B03.660.075.550.500.200 – Nitrosomonas europaea
- MeSH B03.660.075.600 – oxalobacteraceae
- MeSH B03.660.075.600.400 – Herbaspirillum
- MeSH B03.660.075.600.600 – Oxalobacter formigenes
- MeSH B03.660.075.645 – ralstoniaceae
- MeSH B03.660.075.645.650 – Ralstonia
- MeSH B03.660.075.645.650.600 – Ralstonia pickettii
- MeSH B03.660.075.645.650.750 – Ralstonia solanacearum
- MeSH B03.660.075.645.900 – Wautersia
- MeSH B03.660.075.645.900.250 – Wautersia eutropha
- MeSH B03.660.075.655 – rhodocyclaceae
- MeSH B03.660.075.655.070 – Azoarcus
- MeSH B03.660.075.655.800 – Thauera
- MeSH B03.660.075.655.975 – Zoogloea
- MeSH B03.660.075.710 – Spirillaceae
- MeSH B03.660.075.710.750 – Spirillum

==== MeSH B03.660.125 – Deltaproteobacteria ====
NOTE: The class Deltaproteobacteria has been dismantled and its members have been assigned to new phyla (indicated in parentheses).

- MeSH B03.660.125.050 – Bdellovibrio (Bdellovibrionota)
- MeSH B03.660.125.087 – Bilophila (Thermodesulfobacteriota)
- MeSH B03.660.125.125 – Desulfovibrio (Thermodesulfobacteriota)
- MeSH B03.660.125.125.040 – Desulfovibrio africanus
- MeSH B03.660.125.125.150 – Desulfovibrio desulfuricans
- MeSH B03.660.125.125.350 – Desulfovibrio gigas
- MeSH B03.660.125.125.875 – Desulfovibrio vulgaris
- MeSH B03.660.125.150 – Desulfuromonas (Thermodesulfobacteriota)
- MeSH B03.660.125.305 – Geobacter (Thermodesulfobacteriota)
- MeSH B03.660.125.460 – Lawsonia bacteria (Thermodesulfobacteriota)
- MeSH B03.660.125.500 – myxococcales (Myxococcota)
- MeSH B03.660.125.500.605 – Myxococcus
- MeSH B03.660.125.500.605.900 – Myxococcus xanthus
- MeSH B03.660.125.500.710 – Stigmatella
- MeSH B03.660.125.500.710.050 – Stigmatella aurantiaca

==== MeSH B03.660.150 – Campylobacterota ====
- MeSH B03.660.150.050 – Arcobacter
- MeSH B03.660.150.100 – Campylobacter
- MeSH B03.660.150.100.100 – Campylobacter coli
- MeSH B03.660.150.100.220 – Campylobacter fetus
- MeSH B03.660.150.100.297 – Campylobacter hyointestinalis
- MeSH B03.660.150.100.375 – Campylobacter jejuni
- MeSH B03.660.150.100.450 – Campylobacter lari
- MeSH B03.660.150.100.700 – Campylobacter rectus
- MeSH B03.660.150.100.740 – Campylobacter sputorum
- MeSH B03.660.150.100.850 – Campylobacter upsaliensis
- MeSH B03.660.150.250 – Gastrospirillum
- MeSH B03.660.150.280 – Helicobacter
- MeSH B03.660.150.280.350 – Helicobacter felis
- MeSH B03.660.150.280.400 – Helicobacter heilmannii
- MeSH B03.660.150.280.410 – Helicobacter hepaticus
- MeSH B03.660.150.280.480 – Helicobacter mustelae
- MeSH B03.660.150.280.550 – Helicobacter pylori
- MeSH B03.660.150.920 – Wolinella

==== MeSH B03.660.250 – gammaproteobacteria ====
- MeSH B03.660.250.015 – Acidithiobacillus
- MeSH B03.660.250.015.800 – Acidithiobacillus thiooxidans
- MeSH B03.660.250.017 – aeromonadaceae
- MeSH B03.660.250.017.025 – Aeromonas
- MeSH B03.660.250.017.025.380 – Aeromonas hydrophila
- MeSH B03.660.250.017.025.690 – Aeromonas salmonicida
- MeSH B03.660.250.021 – alteromonadaceae
- MeSH B03.660.250.021.020 – Alteromonas
- MeSH B03.660.250.021.500 – Moritella
- MeSH B03.660.250.021.600 – Pseudoalteromonas
- MeSH B03.660.250.021.755 – Shewanella
- MeSH B03.660.250.021.755.750 – Shewanella putrefaciens
- MeSH B03.660.250.050 – Buchnera
- MeSH B03.660.250.080 – cardiobacteriaceae
- MeSH B03.660.250.080.100 – Cardiobacterium
- MeSH B03.660.250.080.550 – Dichelobacter nodosus
- MeSH B03.660.250.110 – chromatiaceae
- MeSH B03.660.250.110.150 – Chromatium
- MeSH B03.660.250.110.400 – Halothiobacillus
- MeSH B03.660.250.110.750 – Thiocapsa
- MeSH B03.660.250.110.750.660 – Thiocapsa roseopersicina
- MeSH B03.660.250.132 – coxiellaceae
- MeSH B03.660.250.132.150 – Coxiella
- MeSH B03.660.250.132.150.100 – Coxiella burnetii
- MeSH B03.660.250.145 – ectothiorhodospiraceae
- MeSH B03.660.250.145.500 – Ectothiorhodospira
- MeSH B03.660.250.145.500.720 – Ectothiorhodospira shaposhnikovii
- MeSH B03.660.250.145.750 – Halorhodospira halophila
- MeSH B03.660.250.150 – enterobacteriaceae
- MeSH B03.660.250.150.095 – Calymmatobacterium
- MeSH B03.660.250.150.100 – Citrobacter
- MeSH B03.660.250.150.100.210 – Citrobacter freundii
- MeSH B03.660.250.150.100.475 – Citrobacter koseri
- MeSH B03.660.250.150.100.737 – Citrobacter rodentium
- MeSH B03.660.250.150.160 – Edwardsiella
- MeSH B03.660.250.150.160.340 – Edwardsiella ictaluri
- MeSH B03.660.250.150.160.750 – Edwardsiella tarda
- MeSH B03.660.250.150.170 – Enterobacter
- MeSH B03.660.250.150.170.049 – Enterobacter aerogenes
- MeSH B03.660.250.150.170.100 – Enterobacter cloacae
- MeSH B03.660.250.150.170.700 – Enterobacter sakazakii
- MeSH B03.660.250.150.175 – Erwinia
- MeSH B03.660.250.150.175.050 – Erwinia amylovora
- MeSH B03.660.250.150.180 – Escherichia
- MeSH B03.660.250.150.180.100 – Escherichia coli
- MeSH B03.660.250.150.180.100.049 – Escherichia coli k12
- MeSH B03.660.250.150.180.100.100 – Escherichia coli o157
- MeSH B03.660.250.150.280 – Hafnia
- MeSH B03.660.250.150.280.050 – Hafnia alvei
- MeSH B03.660.250.150.400 – Klebsiella
- MeSH B03.660.250.150.400.580 – Klebsiella oxytoca
- MeSH B03.660.250.150.400.590 – Klebsiella pneumoniae
- MeSH B03.660.250.150.410 – Kluyvera
- MeSH B03.660.250.150.500 – Morganella
- MeSH B03.660.250.150.500.500 – Morganella morganii
- MeSH B03.660.250.150.540 – Pantoea
- MeSH B03.660.250.150.542 – Pectobacterium
- MeSH B03.660.250.150.542.120 – Pectobacterium carotovorum
- MeSH B03.660.250.150.542.150 – Pectobacterium chrysanthemi
- MeSH B03.660.250.150.545 – Photorhabdus
- MeSH B03.660.250.150.550 – Plesiomonas
- MeSH B03.660.250.150.590 – Proteus
- MeSH B03.660.250.150.590.500 – Proteus mirabilis
- MeSH B03.660.250.150.590.670 – Proteus penneri
- MeSH B03.660.250.150.590.840 – Proteus vulgaris
- MeSH B03.660.250.150.600 – Providencia
- MeSH B03.660.250.150.655 – Rahnella
- MeSH B03.660.250.150.710 – Salmonella
- MeSH B03.660.250.150.710.050 – Salmonella arizonae
- MeSH B03.660.250.150.710.160 – Salmonella enterica
- MeSH B03.660.250.150.710.160.160 – Salmonella enteritidis
- MeSH B03.660.250.150.710.160.580 – Salmonella paratyphi A
- MeSH B03.660.250.150.710.160.710 – Salmonella paratyphi B
- MeSH B03.660.250.150.710.160.711 – Salmonella paratyphi C
- MeSH B03.660.250.150.710.160.750 – Salmonella typhi
- MeSH B03.660.250.150.710.160.760 – Salmonella typhimurium
- MeSH B03.660.250.150.720 – Serratia
- MeSH B03.660.250.150.720.480 – Serratia liquefaciens
- MeSH B03.660.250.150.720.500 – Serratia marcescens
- MeSH B03.660.250.150.730 – Shigella
- MeSH B03.660.250.150.730.050 – Shigella boydii
- MeSH B03.660.250.150.730.125 – Shigella dysenteriae
- MeSH B03.660.250.150.730.210 – Shigella flexneri
- MeSH B03.660.250.150.730.710 – Shigella sonnei
- MeSH B03.660.250.150.880 – Wigglesworthia
- MeSH B03.660.250.150.910 – Xenorhabdus
- MeSH B03.660.250.150.950 – Yersinia
- MeSH B03.660.250.150.950.160 – Yersinia enterocolitica
- MeSH B03.660.250.150.950.580 – Yersinia pestis
- MeSH B03.660.250.150.950.590 – Yersinia pseudotuberculosis
- MeSH B03.660.250.150.950.650 – Yersinia rucker
- MeSH B03.660.250.200 – Francisella
- MeSH B03.660.250.200.750 – Francisella tularensis
- MeSH B03.660.250.350 – halomonadaceae
- MeSH B03.660.250.350.500 – Halomonas
- MeSH B03.660.250.460 – legionellaceae
- MeSH B03.660.250.460.460 – Legionella
- MeSH B03.660.250.460.460.480 – Legionella longbeachae
- MeSH B03.660.250.460.460.580 – Legionella pneumophila
- MeSH B03.660.250.500 – methylococcaceae
- MeSH B03.660.250.500.500 – Methylococcus
- MeSH B03.660.250.500.500.100 – Methylococcus capsulatus
- MeSH B03.660.250.500.505 – Methylomonas
- MeSH B03.660.250.530 – moraxellaceae
- MeSH B03.660.250.530.050 – Acinetobacter
- MeSH B03.660.250.530.050.099 – Acinetobacter baumannii
- MeSH B03.660.250.530.050.200 – Acinetobacter calcoaceticus
- MeSH B03.660.250.530.525 – Moraxella
- MeSH B03.660.250.530.525.200 – Moraxella (Branhamella) catarrhalis
- MeSH B03.660.250.530.525.500 – Moraxella (Moraxella) bovis
- MeSH B03.660.250.530.650 – Psychrobacter
- MeSH B03.660.250.540 – oceanospirillaceae
- MeSH B03.660.250.550 – pasteurellaceae
- MeSH B03.660.250.550.050 – Actinobacillus
- MeSH B03.660.250.550.050.050 – Actinobacillus actinomycetemcomitans
- MeSH B03.660.250.550.050.200 – Actinobacillus equuli
- MeSH B03.660.250.550.050.580 – Actinobacillus pleuropneumoniae
- MeSH B03.660.250.550.050.675 – Actinobacillus seminis
- MeSH B03.660.250.550.050.700 – Actinobacillus suis
- MeSH B03.660.250.550.290 – Haemophilus
- MeSH B03.660.250.550.290.125 – Haemophilus ducreyi
- MeSH B03.660.250.550.290.330 – Haemophilus influenzae
- MeSH B03.660.250.550.290.330.150 – Haemophilus influenzae type B
- MeSH B03.660.250.550.290.665 – Haemophilus paragallinarum
- MeSH B03.660.250.550.290.675 – Haemophilus parainfluenzae
- MeSH B03.660.250.550.290.690 – Haemophilus paraphrophilus
- MeSH B03.660.250.550.290.700 – Haemophilus parasuis
- MeSH B03.660.250.550.290.750 – Haemophilus somnus
- MeSH B03.660.250.550.500 – Mannheimia
- MeSH B03.660.250.550.500.500 – Mannheimia haemolytica
- MeSH B03.660.250.550.590 – Pasteurella
- MeSH B03.660.250.550.590.500 – Pasteurella multocida
- MeSH B03.660.250.550.590.650 – Pasteurella pneumotropica
- MeSH B03.660.250.565 – piscirickettsiaceae
- MeSH B03.660.250.580 – pseudomonadaceae
- MeSH B03.660.250.580.045 – azotobacteraceae
- MeSH B03.660.250.580.045.500 – Azotobacter
- MeSH B03.660.250.580.045.500.820 – Azotobacter vinelandii
- MeSH B03.660.250.580.100 – Cellvibrio
- MeSH B03.660.250.580.590 – Pseudomonas
- MeSH B03.660.250.580.590.050 – Pseudomonas aeruginosa
- MeSH B03.660.250.580.590.070 – Pseudomonas alcaligenes
- MeSH B03.660.250.580.590.210 – Pseudomonas fluorescens
- MeSH B03.660.250.580.590.230 – Pseudomonas fragi
- MeSH B03.660.250.580.590.500 – Pseudomonas mendocina
- MeSH B03.660.250.580.590.570 – Pseudomonas oleovorans
- MeSH B03.660.250.580.590.575 – Pseudomonas pseudoalcaligenes
- MeSH B03.660.250.580.590.580 – Pseudomonas putida
- MeSH B03.660.250.580.590.750 – Pseudomonas stutzeri
- MeSH B03.660.250.580.590.770 – Pseudomonas syringae
- MeSH B03.660.250.740 – succinivibrionaceae
- MeSH B03.660.250.740.050 – Anaerobiospirillum
- MeSH B03.660.250.770 – thiotrichaceae
- MeSH B03.660.250.830 – vibrionaceae
- MeSH B03.660.250.830.590 – Photobacterium
- MeSH B03.660.250.830.830 – Vibrio
- MeSH B03.660.250.830.830.030 – Vibrio alginolyticus
- MeSH B03.660.250.830.830.100 – Vibrio cholerae
- MeSH B03.660.250.830.830.100.075 – Vibrio cholerae non-O1
- MeSH B03.660.250.830.830.100.151 – Vibrio cholerae O1
- MeSH B03.660.250.830.830.100.200 – Vibrio cholerae O139
- MeSH B03.660.250.830.830.250 – Vibrio fischeri
- MeSH B03.660.250.830.830.500 – Vibrio mimicus
- MeSH B03.660.250.830.830.590 – Vibrio parahaemolyticus
- MeSH B03.660.250.830.830.745 – Vibrio salmonicida
- MeSH B03.660.250.830.830.900 – Vibrio vulnificus
- MeSH B03.660.250.915 – xanthomonadaceae
- MeSH B03.660.250.915.750 – Stenotrophomonas
- MeSH B03.660.250.915.750.500 – Stenotrophomonas maltophilia
- MeSH B03.660.250.915.930 – Xanthomonas
- MeSH B03.660.250.915.930.100 – Xanthomonas campestris
- MeSH B03.660.250.915.930.850 – Xanthomonas vesicatoria
- MeSH B03.660.250.915.950 – Xylella

=== MeSH B03.851 – spirochaetales ===
==== MeSH B03.851.475 – leptospiraceae ====
- MeSH B03.851.475.475 – Leptospira
- MeSH B03.851.475.475.400 – Leptospira interrogans
- MeSH B03.851.475.475.400.050 – Leptospira interrogans serovar australis
- MeSH B03.851.475.475.400.055 – Leptospira interrogans serovar autumnalis
- MeSH B03.851.475.475.400.150 – Leptospira interrogans serovar anicola
- MeSH B03.851.475.475.400.400 – Leptospira interrogans serovar hebdomadis
- MeSH B03.851.475.475.400.420 – Leptospira interrogans serovar icterohaemorrhagiae
- MeSH B03.851.475.475.400.650 – Leptospira interrogans serovar pomona

==== MeSH B03.851.595 – spirochaetaceae ====
- MeSH B03.851.595.193 – Borrelia
- MeSH B03.851.595.193.150 – Borrelia burgdorferi group
- MeSH B03.851.595.193.150.125 – Borrelia burgdorferi
- MeSH B03.851.595.670 – Serpulina
- MeSH B03.851.595.670.400 – Serpulina hyodysenteriae
- MeSH B03.851.595.679 – Spirochaeta
- MeSH B03.851.595.795 – Treponema
- MeSH B03.851.595.795.200 – Treponema denticola
- MeSH B03.851.595.795.840 – Treponema pallidum

=== MeSH B03.900 – sulfur-reducing bacteria ===
==== MeSH B03.900.350 – Desulfovibrio ====
- MeSH B03.900.350.040 – Desulfovibrio africanus
- MeSH B03.900.350.150 – Desulfovibrio desulfuricans
- MeSH B03.900.350.350 – Desulfovibrio gigas
- MeSH B03.900.350.875 – Desulfovibrio vulgaris

==== MeSH B03.900.370 – Desulfuromonas ====
The list continues at List of MeSH codes (B04).
