= Edwardsiella piscicida =

Scientific classification
- Domain: Bacteria
- Kingdom: Pseudomonadati
- Phylum: Pseudomonadota
- Class: Gammaproteobacteria
- Order: Enterobacterales
- Family: Hafniaceae
- Genus: Edwardsiella
- Species: E. piscicida

Binomial name
- Edwardsiella piscicida Abayneh et al., 2013

Species of bacterium

Edwardsiella piscicida is a species of gram-negative, rod-shaped bacterium from the order Enterobacterales. This species is a prominent bacterial pathogen in freshwater and marine fish. E. piscida is responsible for a significant amount of economic loss in aquaculture worldwide. Before its recognition as a separate species in 2013, many E. piscida isolates were misidentified as Edwardsiella tarda.

== Taxonomy ==
The genus Edwardsiella was first described 1960s with two independent groups isolating the bacterium from snakes and a patient with gastroenteritis. The genus was validly established in 1965 with the description of Edwardsiella tarda. Additional species including E. horshinae and E. ictaluri were later described from reptiles, birds, and catfish.

Edwardsiella piscicida was formally described as a novel species in 2013 after genetic and phylogentic studies demonstrated that many fish-pathogenic isolates previously identified as Edwardsiella tarda represented a distinct clade. The species is now recognized as one of the five members of the genus alongside E. anguillarum, E. ictaluri, E. tarda, and E. horshinae.

== Phenotypic characteristics ==
=== Morphology and growth characteristics ===
Edwardsiella piscicida is a facultatively anaerobic, gram-negative rod that is usually motile. Colonies are generally small, circular, smooth and white to grayish-white in appearance, resembling other members of its genus.

The bacterium grows on a variety of routine laboratory media including tryptic soy agar, brain heart infusion agar, Mueller-Hinton agar, and marine agar.

=== Biochemical characteristics ===
E. piscicida is an oxidase-negative, rod-shaped bacterium that is usually motile. Similar to many other Edwardsiella species, E. piscicida is able to breakdown tryptophan to produce indole and is typically positive for lysine and ornithine decarboxylase activity. E. piscicida is generally considered hydrogen sulfide positive, although some strains reportedly produce little to no hydrogen sulfide.

This species ferments glucose, mannose, and maltose.

The fatty acid profile of E. piscicida is composed primarily of saturated, unsaturated, and cyclopropane fatty acids, with major components including tetrecanoic acid, hexadecanoic acid, and lactobacillic acid analogues.

== Virulence factors ==
=== Secretion systems ===
The type III secretion system (T3SS) and type VI secretion system (T6SS) are major virulence factors in Edwardsiella piscicida. The T3SS functions as a needle-like secretion apparatus that injects effector proteins directly into host cells, allowing the bacterium to manipulate host signalling pathways, evade immune defense, and promote intracellular survival. Mutations affecting T3SS-associated effector proteins have been shown to reduce intracellular replication and attenuate virulence in fish infection models. The T6SS also contributes to pathogenicity as mutations in T6SS-associated effector proteins have been shown to reduce virulence in zebrafish and turbot models. Additionally, the T6SS is thought to contribute to interbacterial competition and adaptation within aquatic environments.

=== Extracellular products ===
E. piscicida secretes several extracellular products that are proposed to play a role in virulence. The species also produces hemolysins to breakdown host red blood cells to access iron. Hemolysins have been shown experimentally in E. tarda to be essential for fish invasion. Other extracellular proteins produced include amylase, protease, and lecithinase.

=== Adhesion factors ===
E. piscicida produces an invasin (Inv1) and several adhesins (FliC, FlgD) on the cell surface. Contact and adhesion factors are believed to play a role in forming biofilms. However, the ability to form biofilms does not appear to be essential for E. piscicida in the fish as virulent strains are unable to form biofilms under experimental conditions.

== Aquaculture ==
Edwardsiella piscicida is considered a major bacterial pathogen in global aquaculture and causes the disease known as Edwardsiellosis. Surveys on catfish farms in thee southern United States found that Edwardsiella sp. were the third leading bacterial cause of mortality, after Aeromonas hydrophilia and columnaris.

This bacterium has been isolated from numerous fish species including, whitefish (Coregonus lavaretus), Nile tilapia (Oreochromis niloticus), spotted sea bass (Lateolabrax maculatus), and burrundi.

=== Pathogenesis ===
E. piscicida acts as an opportunistic pathogen, with disease outbreaks commonly occurring under conditions of aquatic environmental stress, such as higher water temperatures, water pollution, or poor water quality. Misuse of antibiotics is also a potential risk factor.

Damaged intestinal mucosa are considered a major portal of entry. E. piscicida utilizes actin condensation for entry into epithelial cells. This species is capable of intracellular survival within epithelial cells and macrophages. Following host entry, E. piscicida can disseminate systemically and infect multiple organs.

=== Signs and symptoms ===
Fish infected with edwardsielliosis commonly present with skin discoloration, ulcerative lesions, ascites, and exophthalmia. Septicemia and hemorrhaging may also occur. Internal lesions may include granulomas, necrosis of the liver and kidney, and abscesses.

=== Treatment ===
Edwardsiella piscicida is generally susceptible to antibiotics commonly used to treat edwardsiellosis, including trimethoprim/sulfamethoxazole, florfenicol, oxytetracycline, and enrofloxacin. Acquired resistance to trimethoprim, oxytetracycline, and moxifloxacin have been reported.

Phage therapy is being explored as a possible alternative to antibiotics. The bacteriophage EPP-1 has been shown to effectively inhibit E. piscicida growth and improve survival outcomes in zebrafish.

=== Prevention ===
Vaccines are a validated, cost-effective preventative measure that can be taken against bacterial infections. An adjuvanted formalin-killed vaccine was developed that showed 90-100% relative percent survival. Live attenuated vaccines generated through disrupting secretion systems or regulatory genes have also been shown to be effective at preventing E. piscicida infection in experimental infection models. However, they are unlikely to be suitable for aquaculture due to environmental concerns.
