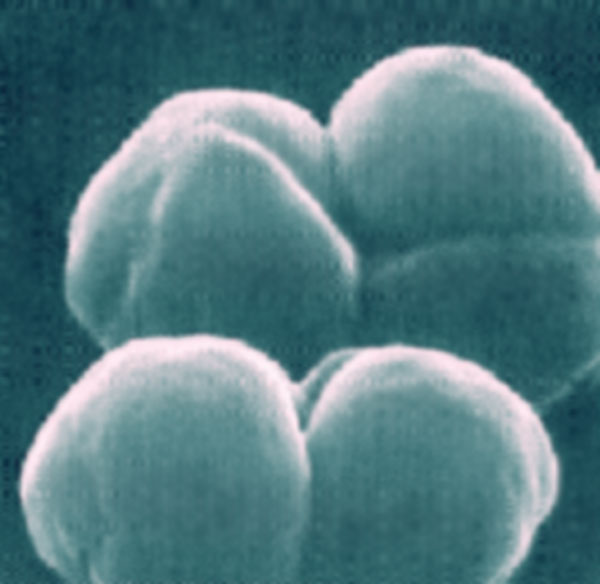

Scientific classification
- Domain: Bacteria
- Kingdom: Pseudomonadati
- Phylum: Pseudomonadota
- Class: Gammaproteobacteria
- Order: Methylococcales
- Family: Methylococcaceae
- Genus: Methylomonas
- Species: M. methanica

Binomial name
- Methylomonas methanica (ex Söhngen 1906); Whittenbury and Krieg 1984

Type strain
- ATCC 35067; NCIB 11130; NCIMB 11130; UNIQEM 8; VKM B-2110

Synonyms
- Synonymy: Bacillus methanicus Söhngen 1906; Methamonas methanica (Söhngen 1906) Orla-Jensen 1909; Pseudomonas methanica (Söhngen 1906) Krasil’nikov 1949; Pseudomonas methanica (Söhngen 1906) sensu Dworkin and Foster 1956; Methylomonas methanica (Söhngen 1906) Leadbetter 1974

= Methylomonas methanica =

Species of bacterium

Methylomonas methanica is a Gram-negative bacterium that obtains its carbon and energy from methane, a metabolic process called methanotrophy. It is found in lakes, ponds, freshwater sediment and marshy ground. They are motile, the cells are rod-shaped.
