= Methylomonas scandinavica =

Scientific classification
- Domain: Bacteria
- Kingdom: Pseudomonadati
- Phylum: Pseudomonadota
- Class: Gammaproteobacteria
- Order: Methylococcales
- Family: Methylococcaceae
- Genus: Methylomonas
- Species: M. scandinavica

Binomial name
- Methylomonas scandinavica Kalyuzhnaya et al., 2000

Species of bacterium

Methylomonas scandinavica is a species of Gram-negative gammaproteobacteria found in deep igneous rock ground water in Sweden. As a member of the Methylomonas genus, M. scandinavica has the ability to use methane as a carbon source.

== Identification ==
A particular strain of M. scandinavica called SR5 was isolated and characterized. M. scandinavica is a Gram-negative bacterium that exhibits pink, rod-shaped colonies. They possess a single, polar flagellum used for motility. This species of Methylomonas is an obligate methanotroph. It is also psychrophilic. M. scandinavica has an optimal temperature of 15 °C, but can grow within 5-30 °C. Growth rates improved without the presence of NaCl. This species also has an optimal pH range of 6.8-7.6, but can grow within a range of pH 5–9. M. scandinavica has a generation time of 15 hours. M. scandinavica is classified as having a type I internal membrane that contains numerous disc-shaped vesicles distributed throughout the organism. M. scandinavica reproduces by binary fission. No known pathogenic traits are associated with M. scandinavica.

== Speciation ==
The speciation of M. scandinavica was determined by 16S rRNA gene sequencing. Protein and physiological analysis of the cells were also undertaken. The DNA-DNA hybridization technique comparing the isolated Methylomonas species in vitro with other Type I methanotrophs; values did not exceed 65%.

== Biochemistry ==
M. scandinavica does not use multiple-carbon substrates as sources of carbon and energy. It uses the ribulose monophosphate pathway to incorporate methane and methanol into its biosynthetic metabolism. Following incorporation of the methane molecule, the organism uses an incomplete TCA cycle to generate reducing power for other portions of central metabolism. The TCA cycle is incomplete due to the inactivity of the α-ketoglutarate dehydrogenase enzyme. M. scandinavica also uses ammonia and nitrate as nitrogen sources. These precursor metabolites are incorporated via the glutamate cycle and reductive amination of pyruvate. This is confirmed by the presence of glutamine synthetase, glutamate synthase, and alanine dehydrogenase.

Since M. scandinavica dwells deep within igneous rock aquifers, they may play a role in subsurface ecology. Methane is consumed, which can provide syntrophs with a carbon sources. Methane oxidation products include methanol, formaldehyde, and formate. All of these products can be used by autotrophic methanogens.
