= Methylobacter tundripaludum =

Scientific classification
- Domain: Bacteria
- Kingdom: Pseudomonadati
- Phylum: Pseudomonadota
- Class: Gammaproteobacteria
- Order: Methylococcales
- Family: Methylococcaceae
- Genus: Methylobacter
- Species: M. tundripaludum

Binomial name
- Methylobacter tundripaludum Wartiainen et al. 2006

Species of bacterium

Methylobacter tundripaludum is a methane-oxidizing bacterium isolated in July 1996 from a wetland soil sampled near Ny-Ålesund, Svalbard. It is Gram-negative, rod-shaped, non-motile, non-spore forming, with type strain SV96^{T} (=DSM 17260^{T} =ATCC BAA-1195^{T}). Its genome has been sequenced.
