= Edwardsiella anguillarum =

- TEM of E. anguillarum

Scientific classification
- Domain: Bacteria
- Kingdom: Pseudomonadati
- Phylum: Pseudomonadota
- Class: Gammaproteobacteria
- Order: Enterobacterales
- Family: Hafniaceae
- Genus: Edwardsiella
- Species: E. anguillarum

Binomial name
- Edwardsiella anguillarum Shao et al. 2015

Species of bacterium

Edwardsiella anguillarum is a species of gram-negative, rod-shaped bacterium from the order Enterobacterales. It is a pathogen of fish and is known for causing edwardsiellosis in farmed eels.

== Description ==
Edwardsiella anguillarum is a gram-negative, rod-shaped bacterium. Cells are approximately 0.6 μm long. The bacterium is positive for catalase, indole, and hydrogen sulfide production. Similar to most members of the Enterobacterales, E. anguillarum is oxidase negative. Most strains, including the type strain, are motile through peritrichous flagella; however, a highly virulent strain that lacks flagella has been described. E. anguillarum is a facultative anaerobe, growing under aerobic and anaerobic conditions.

== Disease in fish ==
Edwardsiella anguillarum causes edwardsiellosis, a systemic bacterial disease of fish. It is particularly associated with disease in farmed eels.

== Host range and distribution ==
Edwardsiella anguillarum has been reported from both freshwater and marine fishes. The type strain was first isolated from farmed eels in Japan. However, the bacterium has since been identified in outbreaks outside of the Far East. E. anguillarum has been reported to infect Japanese eels (Anguilla japonica), American eels (Anguilla rostrata), Nile tilapia (Oreochromis niloticus), and groupers (Epinephelus aeneus and E. marginatus).
