= Methylosphaera hansonii =

Scientific classification
- Domain: Bacteria
- Kingdom: Pseudomonadati
- Phylum: Pseudomonadota
- Class: Gammaproteobacteria
- Order: Methylococcales
- Family: Methylococcaceae
- Genus: Methylosphaera
- Species: M. hansonii

Binomial name
- Methylosphaera hansonii J.P.Bowman et al. 1997

Species of bacterium

Methylosphaera hansonii, also called Antarctic budding methanotroph AM6, is a species of psychrophilic, group I methanotrophs, named after microbiologist Richard S. Hanson. It is non-motile, coccoidal in morphology, does not form resting cells, reproduces by constriction, and requires seawater for growth. Its type strain is ACAM 549.

The cells are round and 1.5–2.0 μm in diameter. They are Gram-negative, non-motile, and strictly aerobic. They use methane and methanol as substrates to produce energy, and they can fix atmospheric nitrogen.

== Nomenclature ==
The name has French and Greek roots. Methyl for its methyl group and sphaera for sphere. Overall the name means "methyl sphere."
