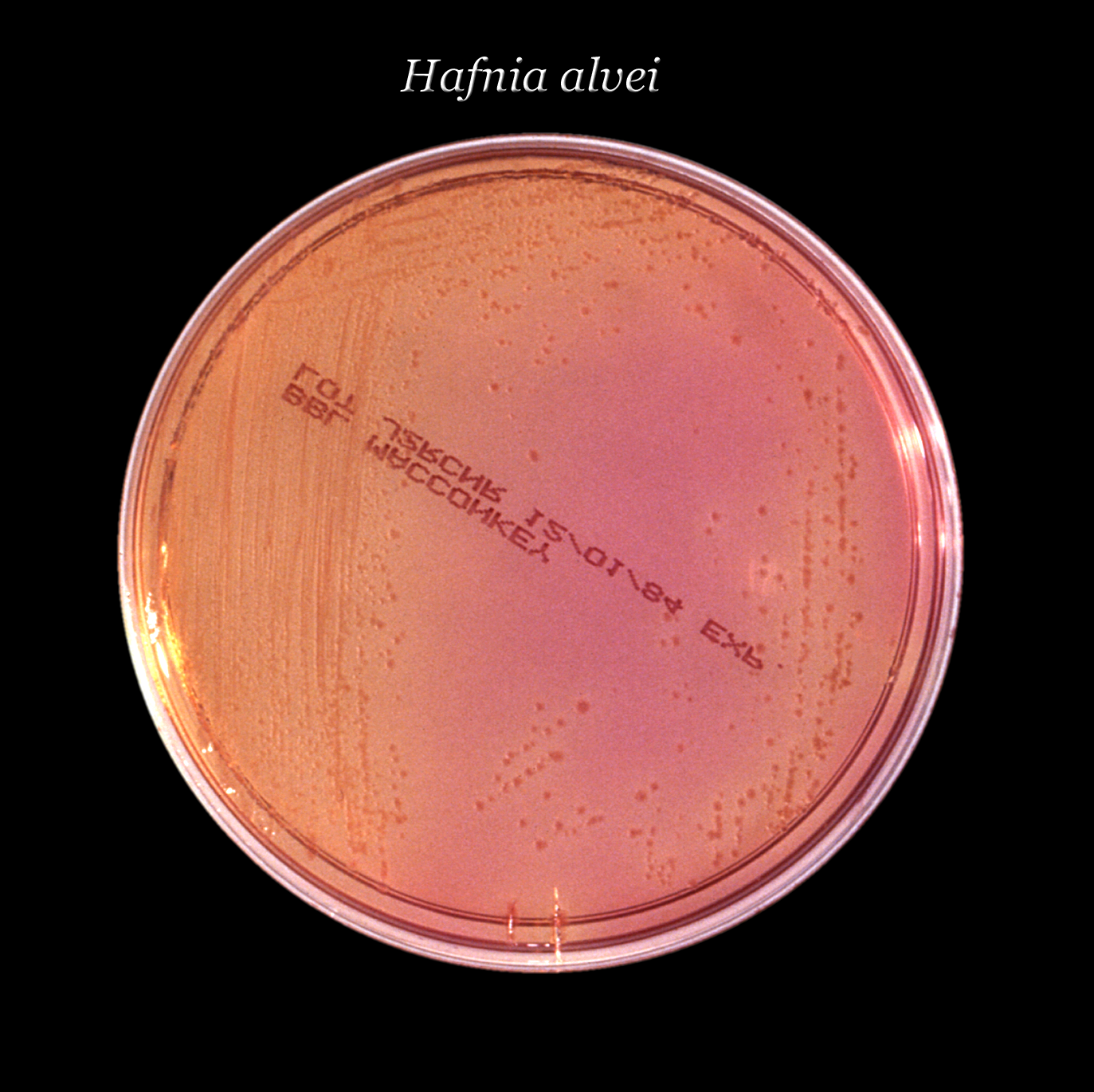
- Hafnia alvei cultures

Scientific classification
- Domain: Bacteria
- Kingdom: Pseudomonadati
- Phylum: Pseudomonadota
- Class: Gammaproteobacteria
- Order: Enterobacterales
- Family: Hafniaceae
- Genus: Hafnia; Møller, 1954

Species
- Hafnia alvei Hafnia paralvei Hafnia psychrotolerans

= Hafnia (bacterium) =

Genus of bacteria

Hafnia is a genus of Gram-negative, facultatively anaerobic, rod-shaped bacteria in the family Hafniaceae.

H. alvei is a commensal of the human gastrointestinal tract and not normally pathogenic, but may cause disease in immunocompromised patients. It is often resistant to multiple antibiotics, including the aminopenicillins.

The name comes from Hafnia, the Latin name for Copenhagen.

Hafnia alvei is used as a lactic ferment by the dairy industry and more recently as a probiotic included in a dietary supplement product.

== History ==
The genus Hafnia is one of more than 40 genera that currently comprise the order Enterobacterales.

Although Møller originally described this genus in 1954, the legitimacy of this group was constantly challenged over the next two decades, often being referred to by synonyms such as "Enterobacter alvei", "Enterobacter aerogenes subsp. hafniae" and "Enterobacter hafniae" but it is mostly referenced by its current name, Hafnia alvei, in the literature.

In 1977, a study concluded that at the end of Camembert manufacturing Hafnia alvei remains as the dominant species. Hafnia alvei is a psychrotrophic strain, which can develop at low temperatures, meaning that it doesn't stop growing during the storage phase of cheese unlike E. coli.

In 1983, Enterobacterales were discovered in freshly produced Camembert: 51% of the identified Enterobacterales were Hafnia alvei strains compared to only 9% of Escherichia coli. These authors also showed that Hafnia alvei grew to a high concentration in cheese (up to 10^{7} CFU/g), in both raw milk and pasteurised milk cheeses.

A few years later, in 1987, Hafnia alvei was identified by a Spanish team in raw ewes' milk representing 6.5% of the total Enterobacterales species present.

In 2014, a collaborative study working on cheese ripening, involving the French INRA and an Italian University, identified H. alvei in raw milk used to make the traditional caciocavallo Pugliese cheese.

Hafnia alvei is also present in fermented foods other than dairy products, it has been identified over the years in traditional meals around the planet.

In 1987, American scientists studying Brassicaceae found Hafnia alvei while analysing the microflora of fresh harvested collards, they believed the Hafnia alvei originated from soil contamination but not necessarily as a pathogen.

Hafnia has also been identified in fermented coffee seeds in Ethiopia and Ohio, USA. American researchers studied the microbiome of the coffee seeds and identified Hafnia alvei among numerous other strains and species, including 13 species of Enterobacterales. This study highlighted that the richness of the seeds' microbiome was linked to the fermentation process and the coffee quality. The richest order of bacteria identified was the Enterobacterales containing Hafnia alvei. This family is often found in humid and nutrient rich environments similar to coffee processing conditions. Thus, they could play a critical role in the fermentation.

Hafnia alvei has also been identified in commercial kimchi, a traditional Korean meal made with Asian cabbage, radish, spices and salted fermented seafood. Scientists suggest the source of Hafnia in this case is the fermented seafood.

In 2004, Mexican scientists isolated Hafnia alvei (among other bacteria such as Lactobacillus acidophilus or plantarum) from pulque a traditional beverage made from fermented Maguey (also known as agave).

And finally, Hafnia alvei was also isolated from meat products, particularly refrigerated beef due to the presence of Hafnia alvei on slaughtered cattle. It can be found alongside E. coli in chorizo, a popular semi-dry fermented Spanish sausage. Fermented sausages made in Spain were also reported to contain the Hafnia alvei strain, responsible for producing histamine that is crucial to the ripening process.

== Commensal strain ==
Most standard microbiology texts list mammals, birds, reptiles, fish, soil, water, sewage, and foods as sources from which hafniae can be recovered.

The gastrointestinal tracts of animals, and in particular mammals, appear to be a very common ecologic habitat for hafniae. Paleomicrobiology investigations have identified H. alvei originating from intestinal mass samples and sediment collected from 12,000-year-old mastodon remains in Michigan and Ohio. In a study of 642 Australian mammals, Gordon and FitzGibbon found that H. alvei was the third most common enteric species identified, following Escherichia coli and E. cloacae. The isolation of H. alvei was significantly associated with recovery from marsupial carnivores and murid rodents.

Hafniae have also been recovered sporadically from the manure samples of pack animals collected from national park trails and from 7% of the grizzly and black bear specimens tested.

Among avian species, H. alvei has been frequently isolated from birds of prey, including falcons, owls, and turkey vultures; even high-altitude alpine accentors that have virtually no contact with humans have had Hafnia isolated from them, at frequencies ranging from 3% to 16%.

Other sources for H. alvei include reptiles (snakes and skinks), invertebrates, insects, fish, and bats.

== Role of H. alvei in cheese ripening ==
According to several publications, Hafnia alvei is present as a dominant species during the ripening of raw milk cheese.

Hafnia alvei is a psychrotrophic bacterium, it originates in raw milk and continues to grow in cheeses such as Camembert. The multiplication is a key factor in the fermentation process and ripening of cheese.

Since 1979, studies of French cheese have led to the identification of correlations between Hafnia alvei growth and chemical parameters during cheese manufacturing. Several researchers estimated that the level of H. alvei reaches 10^{7} CFU/g at the end of ripening process and showed that its growth curve is closely linked to an increase in pH. Similarly, Mounier et al. determined a H. alvei content of about 10^{9} CFU/g in a model smear cheese (soft cheese).

Extensive study of traditional cheeses that have been consumed for years highlight the presence of Hafnia alvei in dairy products for more than thirty years.

In conclusion, abundant levels of Hafnia alvei can be found in raw milk cheese and it plays a large role in cheese aromatisation due to its impact on acidity and capacity to produce free amino-acids.

Hafnia is either intentionally added during the cheesemaking process or it is already present as a constituent of the milk microflora. It contributes to the fermentation process and ripening of cheeses. Metabolic studies revealed that H. alvei is pivotal to the ripening process and the development of the typical cheese flavour.

Because of these properties affecting acidity and flavour, H. alvei has been used in the manufacture of several cheeses, such as cheddar, gouda and camembert, as well as in Livarot and other raw milk cheese. H. alvei is also marketed in the EU as a ripening culture for camembert with a strong aroma (Aroma-Prox AF 036, provided by Bioprox SAS, France) or as blend of microorganisms for soft cheese flavour (Choozit Cheese cultures ARO 21-HA LYO 10 D, provided by Danisco Denmark).

A 2013 study of a cheese model ecosystem highlighted the role of Hafnia alvei in inhibiting the growth of E. coli strain O26:H11 without altering pH or lactic acid concentrations. Hafnia alvei did produce a small amount of biogenic amines such as putrescine and cadaverine but these didn't affect the overall level of volatile aroma compounds.

Interest in Hafnia alvei's roll in cheese making is increasing. A 2007, ANR (French National Research Agency) project (GRAMME) are evaluating the benefits and risks of Hafnia alvei in the production of cheese and studying the potential functions to enlarge its application to other food products.

== Culture growth ==
Hafnia grows in media containing 2% to 5% NaCl, a pH range of 4.9 to 8.25, and thermal gradients of 4 °C to 44 °C; the optimum temperature for growth has been reported as 35 °C.

There is general agreement that almost 100% of Hafnia strains grow on MacConkey, Hektoen enteric, eosin methylene blue, and xylose-lysine-deoxycholate agars, all of which are differential to moderately selective media.

On more inhibitory selective media, 25% to 60% of strains fail to grow on Salmonella-Shigella (SS) agar, while 75% to 100% of isolates are inhibited on brilliant green medium. Classic strains of H. alvei are lactose and sucrose negative and as such appear as nonfermenting colonies on enteric isolation media.

On moderately selective agars, they typically appear as large, smooth, convex, translucent colonies of 2 to 3 mm in diameter with an entire edge; some may exhibit an irregular border.

== Biology ==
=== Lipopolysaccharides ===
The immunochemistry of Hafnia lipopolysaccharides (LPS) are extremely complicated. All H. alvei LPS appear to contain glucose, glucosamine, heptose, and 3-deoxyoctulosonic acid. Some LPS also contain other amino sugars or carbohydrates such as mannose, galactose, galactosamine, and mannosamine. The core oligosaccharide structure of some strains consists of an identical hexasaccharide structure composed of two D-glucose residues, three LD-heptose residues, and one 3-deoxyoctulosonic acid residue. There is extensive serologic and immunologic diversity in this genus, and active research continues in this area.

=== Biotypes ===
In 1969, Barbe described two biotypes of H. alvei based upon fermentation of D-arabinose and salicin and on esculin and arbutin hydrolysis. One challenge that microbiologists face is trying to develop biochemical tests that can readily distinguish most strains of DNA group 1 (H. alvei sensu stricto) from DNA group 2 (unnamed Hafnia species) isolates. These two groups could be distinguished from one another by a series of tests. No single test was completely discriminatory, but motility at 24hr was the best predictor of DNA group (DNA group 1, 9% positive; DNA group 2, 100% positive).

== Pathogenicity and antimicrobial susceptibility ==
There is limited information about the pathogenicity of Hafnia alvei. This is likely due to the low occurrence frequency of this species in human illnesses and the fact that there are no clear-cut disease syndromes specifically associated with H. alvei. The current information regarding Hafnia pathogenicity can be looked at from two perspectives; virulence factors potentially operative in extra intestinal infections and those restricted primarily to the intestin. A study mentions that mice injected intraperitoneally with hafniae did not succumb to infection.

H. alvei is an uncommon human pathogen despite the increased attention from the medical community over the past decade due to its possible association with gastroenteritis.

There are no well-described outbreaks of disease caused by H. alvei in which the epidemiologic, clinical, and laboratory correlates are overwhelmingly in support of an unquestionable role for hafniae in these illnesses.

In a study of 17 Hafnia alvei ("Enterobacter hafniae") isolates recovered by the Mayo Clinic from 1968 to 1970, only 5 isolates (29%) were judged to be clinically significant. In all five of these cases, H. alvei was determined to be a secondary pathogen (respiratory:2; abscess:3). Overall, the mean age of those infected or colonised with H. alvei was 52.9 years, with a male/female ratio of 1:1.1. Slightly over 50% of all isolates were acquired via a nosocomial route, including all five associated with infection. In only two instances was H. alvei recovered in pure culture, and in neither case was the strain clinically significant.

It is interesting to highlight that ATCC considers classifies all Hafnia alvei strains as Biosafety level 1. Furthermore, Richard identified the presence of 10^{8} viable cells per gram of cheese, which suggests a daily consumption of more than 10^{9} bacteria per day (calculation based on a 30 g portion) indicating the good safety profile of Hafnia alvei in daily consumption.

A studying examining the susceptibility of 76 H. alvei isolates to 69 antibiotics. The general pattern that emerges from this study is that hafniae are typically susceptible to carbapenems, monobactams, chloramphenicol, quinolones, aminoglycosides, and antifolates (e.g., trimethoprim-sulfamethoxazole) and resistant to penicillin, oxacillin, and amoxicillin plus clavulanic acid. Susceptibility to tetracyclines and cephalosporins is variable.

A Spanish study, involving enteric pathogens also found that 32 strains of H. alvei were universally susceptible to all quinolones (including gemifloxacin and grepafloxacin), cefotaxime, gentamicin, co-trimoxazole, and naladixic acid; 78% of the strains in that study were susceptible to doxycycline. Some H. alvei strains produce both low-level inducible cephalosporinases (ceftazidime susceptible) and high-level constitutive cephalosporinase activity that is resistant to ceftazidime.

A clinical study testing the intake of the H. alvei HA4597 strain in overweight people has shown the excellent safety of this bacteria.

== Health benefits ==
Hafnia produces a protein called Caseinolytic Protease B (ClpB) which has been shown to be a mimetic of the hormone α-MSH which is implicated in satiety.

Some Enterobacterales bacteria, such as Hafnia alvei have been shown to naturally regulate the appetite.

More specifically, the Hafnia alvei HA4597 strain was tested in ob/ob and high-fat diet-fed obese and overweight mice after administration by gavage. In those two models, the Hafnia alvei strain showed good tolerance, reduced body weight gain and fat mass in both obesity models, and a significant decrease in food intake in ob/ob mice.

Another study describing the administration of the HA4597 strain to high-fat-diet-fed hyperphagic ob/ob male mice, showed a significant decrease (compared to untreated or orlistat-treated mice) in body weight, body fat and food intake but also in treated mice a decrease in blood sugar level, total plasma cholesterol and alanine aminotransaminase.

In 2021, the results of a 12-week clinical study comparing oral intake of strain HA45597 versus placebo, were published in the scientific journal Nutrients. This prospective, multicenter, double-blind, placebo-controlled and randomized study in 236 overweight volunteers (BMI between 25 and 29.9 kg/m2) clinically confirmed the preclinical data. The primary efficacy endpoint "weight loss" was met: a statistically significant difference was observed in favor of the Hafnia alvei group in the proportion of subjects who lost at least 3% of their body weight at 12 weeks (57,7% in the Hafnia group versus 41,7% placebo group, p=0,028). Among the secondary endpoints achieved, a statistically significant increase in the feeling of satiety was noticed. In addition, the effect of the strain is also greater than the placebo in reducing hip circumference. Only Hafnia alvei HA4597 had an effect on the cholesterol level and induced a reduction in blood sugar levels.

The scientific journal, Nature, recently qualified the strain Hafnia alvei HA4597, as a "precision probiotic", that is to say a probiotic whose strain and mechanism of action are fully described and understood scientifically.

TargEDys, a French company, which demonstrated that the Hafnia alvei HA4597 strain could stimulate satiety via the ClpB protein and help to naturally control appetite and lose weight, conducted the studies enabling the marketing of this probiotic.

== Regulatory status ==
Hafnia alvei is a food grade bacteria. It is not listed in the Novel Food catalogue of the European Commission. It is listed on the Danish list of notified microbial cultures applied in food.

Hafnia alvei is part of the IDF positive list (International Dairy Federation) of Microbial Food Cultures (MFC) demonstrating safety requirements in fermented food products for worldwide use. It is also classified as a Natural Health Product in the Canadian NNHPD (Natural and Non-Prescription Health Products Directorate).

The H. alvei HA4597 strain is now marketed in France as a dietary supplement associated with Zinc and Chromium under the names EnteroSatys (TargEDys) and Symbiosys Satylia Chromium and Zinc by the laboratory (Biocodex), as well as with guarana and Chromium under the name of EnteroSatys Weight Management. It is also distributed in Portugal (Symbiosys Satylia), Italy (Satilia), Croatia (EnteroSatys), Turkey (Satylia), and Germany (SymbioLife Satylia).
