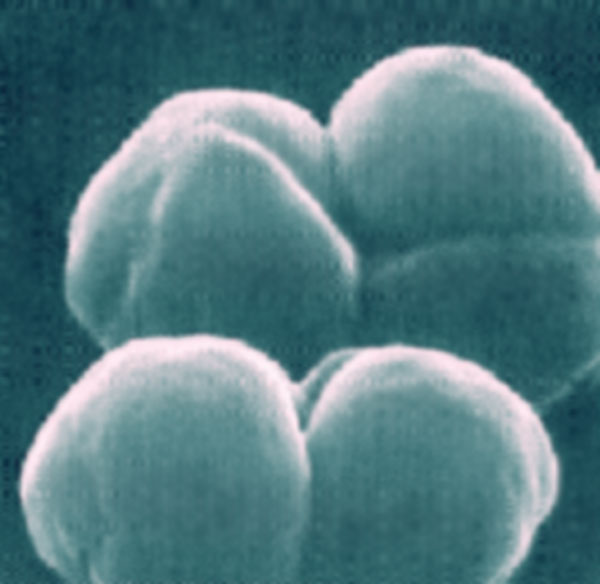

Scientific classification
- Domain: Bacteria
- Kingdom: Pseudomonadati
- Phylum: Pseudomonadota
- Class: Gammaproteobacteria
- Order: Methylococcales
- Family: Methylococcaceae
- Genus: Methylomonas (ex Leadbetter 1974); Whittenbury and Krieg 1984

Type species
- Methylomonas methanica

Species
- M. aurantiaca M. fodinarum M. koyama M. lenta M. methanica M. paludis M. scandinavica

= Methylomonas =

Genus of bacteria

Methylomonas is a genus of bacteria that obtain their carbon and energy from methane, a metabolic process called methanotrophy.
