= Edwardsiella ictaluri =

Scientific classification
- Domain: Bacteria
- Kingdom: Pseudomonadati
- Phylum: Pseudomonadota
- Class: Gammaproteobacteria
- Order: Enterobacterales
- Family: Hafniaceae
- Genus: Edwardsiella
- Species: E. ictaluri

Binomial name
- Edwardsiella ictaluri Hawke & al., 1981

Species of bacterium

Edwardsiella ictaluri (also known as enteric septicaemia of catfish, hole in the head disease and ESC) is a member of the family Hafniaceae. The bacterium is a short, gram negative, pleomorphic rod with flagella. It causes the disease enteric septicaemia of catfish (ESC), which infects a variety of fish species (including many catfish species, knifefish and barbs). The bacteria can cause either acute septicaemia or chronic encephalitis in infected fish. Outbreaks normally occur in spring and autumn.

Edwardsiella ictaluri can be found in Asia and the United States, being of particular economic importance in the U.S. It is not a zoonosis.

== Clinical signs and diagnosis ==
Acute ESC infection causes an acute septicaemia that presents as multiple petechial haemorrhages that develop into depigmented ulcers. Additional clinical signs include abnormal behavior, exophthalmos, hemorrhagic gastroenteritis, edema and ascites. Chronic ESC infection causes a chronic encephalitis. Clinical signs include abnormal behavior, abnormal swimming patterns, swelling and ulceration of the head and death.

Any fish that survive the infection can become latent carriers of the bacteria.

A presumptive diagnosis can be made based on the clinical signs alone but PCR, indirect immunofluorescence, bacterial culture and ELISA can be used to definitively diagnose the disease.

E. ictaluri is the only species from the genus Edwardsiella that is negative for hydrogen sulfide production.

== Treatment and control ==
Several antibiotics can be used to treat the disease, but there are reports of resistance emerging. Vaccination can be used to prevent disease. Management factors such as reducing stocking density and stress should be considered.

== See also ==
- Edwardsiella
- Enterobacterales
- Edwardsiella tarda
- Head and lateral line erosion
