= Edwardsiella (bacterium) =

Scientific classification
- Domain: Bacteria
- Kingdom: Pseudomonadati
- Phylum: Pseudomonadota
- Class: Gammaproteobacteria
- Order: Enterobacterales
- Family: Hafniaceae
- Genus: Edwardsiella; R.Sakazaki et al., 1962

Species
- Edwardsiella anguillarum; Edwardsiella hoshinae; Edwardsiella ictaluri; Edwardsiella piscicida; Edwardsiella tarda

Genus of bacteria

Edwardsiella is a genus of gram-negative, fermentative bacteria of the family Hafniaceae. The genus was first discovered in snakes in 1962.

== Taxonomy ==
The genus Edwardsiella was established in 1965 with the description of Edwardsiella tarda.

== Description ==
A genus of gram-negative, facultatively anaerobic, rod-shaped bacteria of the family Hafniaceae. Similar to other members of the Enterobacterales, Edwardsiella sp are oxidase-negative, catalase-positive, and ferment glucose.

Several members are occasionally opportunistic pathogens of humans.

== Species ==
Species include:

- Edwardsiella anguillarum, a motile species that infects fish.
- Edwardsiella hoshinae, a motile species that, isolated from animals and humans, does not produce indole.
- Edwardsiella ictaluri, a nonmotile species that does not produce indole, and occurs as a pathogen of catfish.
- Edwardsiella piscicida, a species that infects fish.
- Edwardsiella tarda, also known as Edwardsiella anguillimortifera, a species which produces indole, is biochemically similar to Escherichia coli. This species is usually found in aquatic animals and reptiles, and is found in the intestinal tract of snakes and seals. It is occasionally isolated from the urine, blood, and faeces of humans, and has been known to cause gastroenteritis and wound infections. In India, it has been found in children with diarrhoea.
