= Edwardsiella tarda =

Scientific classification
- Domain: Bacteria
- Kingdom: Pseudomonadati
- Phylum: Pseudomonadota
- Class: Gammaproteobacteria
- Order: Enterobacterales
- Family: Hafniaceae
- Genus: Edwardsiella
- Species: E. tarda

Binomial name
- Edwardsiella tarda Ewing et al., 1965

Species of bacterium

Edwardsiella tarda is a member of the family Hafniaceae. The bacterium is a facultatively anaerobic, small, motile, gram negative, straight rod with flagella. Infection causes Edwardsiella septicemia (also known as ES, edwardsiellosis, emphysematous putrefactive disease of catfish, fish gangrene, and red disease) in channel catfish, eels, and flounder. Edwardsiella tarda is also found in largemouth bass and freshwater species such as rainbow trout. It is a zoonosis and can infect a variety of animals including fish, amphibians, reptiles, and mammals. Edwardsiella tarda has also been the cause of periodic infections for various animals within zoos. E. tarda has a worldwide distribution and can be found in pond water, mud, and the intestine of fish and other marine animals. It is spread by carrier animal feces.

== History ==
The creation of the species was suggested by Ewing and colleagues in 1965 in order to cover 37 different strains that mainly were found in fecal materials. Japanese and other scientists were also observing similar bacterium to these and eventually the bacterium were divided into two groups called the Asakusa and Bartholomew groups. Edwardsiella tarda was established as a legitimate genus and species through studies at the Walter Reed Army Institute of Research by Don Brenner. The genus Edwardsiella was named after P. R. Edwards in 1965. Since 1965, strains isolated from fish showing similar biochemical profiles based on the commonly used biochemical tests were identified as Edwardsiella tarda. However it is in 2013, nearly after half a century, that Dr Abayneh and colleagues at Norwegian School of Veterinary science unravelled the wide genetic divergence between strains from fish and that of humans using contemporary genetic characterization methods. These two groups were also known to show phenotypic differences in pathogenicity to fish and in their biochemical profiles in substrates that were not used in routine tests. This led to the description of two novel species from fish viz Edwardsiella piscicida (Abayneh et al., 2013) and Edwardsiella anguillarum (Shao et al. 2015) that were previously mis-classified as E. tarda. This might have addressed the arguments between the Japanese and American investigators with regard to the difficulty of differentiating isolates from fish and humans by the time and ended up classifying all into same species i.e. Edwardsiella tarda.

== Identification ==
Edwardsiella tarda is a non-fastidious Gram-negative rod that grows readily on routine laboratory media. Similar to other members of the enterobacterales, E. tarda is catalase positive, oxidase negative, and glucose fermenting. E. tarda produces hydrogen sulfide and is unable to ferment lactose, making it indistinguishable from Salmonella on routine laboratory media. A positive indole reaction can quickly separate out the two organisms.

== Distribution ==
Edwardsiella tarda is widely distributed throughout the world. It has been found from the water in Japan all the way to the United States. In Japan it was present in the Japanese eel and in some of the Japanese snakes. In the United States it was reported to be found in human feces.

== Oxygen Requirement ==
Edwardsiella tarda is a facultative anaerobic bacterium. It grows best when oxygen is present, but it can still survive in an anaerobic environments.

== Clinical signs and diagnosis ==
Infection can cause organomegaly, ocular disease, rectal prolapse, ecchymosis, and erosions on the skin, inflammation of the gills, oedema, ascites, abnormal behavior, and haemorrhage throughout the body. On postmortem fish they are normally pale with widespread petechial haemorrhage and abscessation. On catfish, lesions will develop into deep abscesses filled with gas and necrotic substances. It can cause a variety of signs in humans including gastroenteritis, meningitis and peritonitis.

A presumptive diagnosis may be made based on the history, clinical signs, and autopsy findings. However E. tarda can be cultured on specific growth mediums such as brain-heart infusion agar and techniques such as indirect fluorescent antibody testing, ELISA and loop-mediated isothermal amplification (LAMP) can be used to confirm diagnosis.

== Treatment and control ==
Antibiotics should be used to treat infected fish. Control of the disease is achieved by vaccination. There are three vaccine types and they should all be administered by water bath. Chemotherapy has also been used in the past in order to avoid disease. Management factors such as reducing stress and stocking density can help prevent disease along with maintaining suitable sanitation of water. Other stress factors include drastic changes in temperature, pH, and dissolved oxygen levels in the water. In order to manage properly for edwardsiellosis water must be checked constantly in order to keep fish stocks completely free of pathogens.

== Current research ==
Some of the most recent research done on Edwardsiella tarda was performed by Griffin et al. (2013) to assess what the literature refers to as "the intra-specific variability of E. tarda isolates from 4 different fish species in the eastern United States." These intra-specific variations that they were looking for occur in other parts of the world where E. tarda is found and they were hoping to discover how similar levels may be in the United States. This could offer scientists a "baseline for the development of more reliable molecular diagnostic tools." The study found that two distinct genotypes do exist within E. tarda but does state that it's completely possible that there are more. This study will be used to improve the accuracy of "molecular diagnostics to better understand the role these genetically distinct E. tarda groups play in fish health."

== Etymology ==
In 1965, a group of CDC researchers described a species of gram-negative, facultatively anaerobic bacteria in the family Enterobacteriaceae, which they named Edwardsiella (for CDC microbiologist Philip R. Edwards) tarda (Latin, "slow", referring to biochemical inactivity and the fact that it ferments few carbohydrates). These organisms infect a variety of fish, reptiles, and amphibians and are opportunistic pathogens for humans.

== See also ==
- Edwardsiella ictaluri
- Type VI secretion system
