= Mycobacterium lepraemurium =

Scientific classification
- Domain: Bacteria
- Kingdom: Bacillati
- Phylum: Actinomycetota
- Class: Actinomycetes
- Order: Mycobacteriales
- Family: Mycobacteriaceae
- Genus: Mycobacterium
- Species: M. lepraemurium

Binomial name
- Mycobacterium lepraemurium Marchoux and Sorel 1912

Species of bacterium

Mycobacterium lepraemurium is a causative agent of feline leprosy. It causes granulomatous lesions, characteristic of the Mycobacterium genus.

== Description ==
Gram-positive, nonmotile and strongly acid-fast rods (3-5 μm long). Slightly rounded ends.

Colony characteristics

- Rough nonchromogenic colonies.

Physiology

- Growth on inspissated 1% egg yolk medium at 30 °C - 37 °C within 4–5 weeks (using large inocula, confined to a concentrated area of the medium, egg white is inhibitory).

== Pathogenesis ==
- Cause of endemic disease of rats in various parts of the world, as well as feline leprosy.
- feline leprosy is transmitted by bites from rats and other cats.
- Disease occurs mainly in the skin and lymph nodes, causing induration, alopecia and eventual ulceration.
- Nodular lesions, involving subcutaneous tissues, may be solitary or multiple and usually confined to the head region or the limbs. Nodules are fleshy and freely movable.
- Surgical excision of the lesions is the preferred treatment.
- Only the densely and uniformly stained forms appear to be infectious for animals, in contrast to the degenerate unevenly stained forms.
- Biosafety level 2

== Type strain ==
None specified due to difficulties in cultivation.
