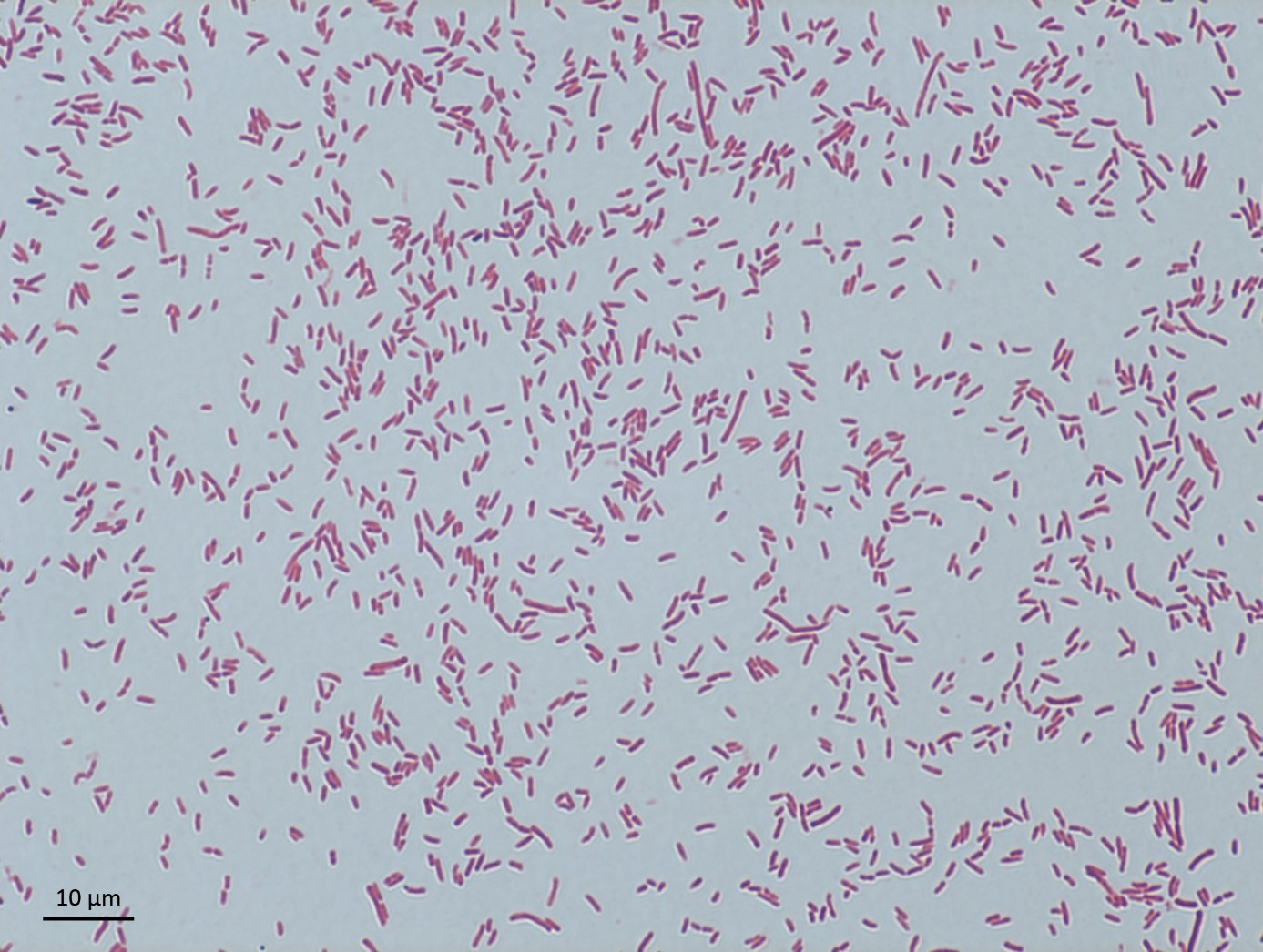
- Image of cultured Hafnia alvei under a microscope

Scientific classification
- Domain: Bacteria
- Kingdom: Pseudomonadati
- Phylum: Pseudomonadota
- Class: Gammaproteobacteria
- Order: Enterobacterales
- Family: Hafniaceae; Adeolu et al., 2016

Genera
- Edwardsiella; Hafnia; Obesumbacterium

= Hafniaceae =

Family of bacteria

The Hafniaceae are a family of Gram-negative bacteria. This family is a member of the order Enterobacterales in the class Gammaproteobacteria of the phylum Pseudomonadota. Genera in this family include the type genus Hafnia, along with Edwardsiella and Obesumbacterium.

The name Hafniaceae is derived from the Latin term Hafnia, referring the type genus of the family and the suffix "-aceae", an ending used to denote a family. Together, Hafniaceae refers to a family whose nomenclatural type is the genus Hafnia.

== Biochemical characteristics and molecular signatures ==
Members are catalase-positive, oxidase-negative, and negative for lysine decarboxylase. These bacteria are also able to grow on MacConkey media, and are capable of reducing nitrate.

Four conserved signature indels (CSIs) were identified for this family in the proteins two-component system response regulator GIrR, glucose-1-phosphate adenylyltransferase, transcriptional activator NhaR, and the hybrid sensor histidine kinase/response regulator. These molecular signatures were identified through genomic analyses and serves as a reliable molecular means to distinguish members of this family from other families within the order Enterobacterales and all other bacteria.

== Historical systematics and current Taxonomy ==
Hafniaceae, as of 2021, contains three validly published genera. Members of this family were originally members of the family Enterobacteriaceae, a large phylogenetically unrelated group of species with distinct biochemical characteristics and different ecological niches. The original assignment of species into the family Enterobacteriaceae was largely based on 16S rRNA genome sequence analyses, which is known to have low discriminatory power and the results of which changes depends on the algorithm and organism information used. Despite this, the analyses still exhibited polyphyletic branching, indicating the presence of distinct subgroups within the family.

In 2016, Adeolu et al. proposed the division of Enterobacteriaceae into 7 novel families based on comparative genomic analyses and the branching pattern of various phylogenetic trees constructed from conserved genome sequences, 16S rRNA sequences and multilocus sequence analyses. Molecular markers, specifically conserved signature indels, specific to this family were also identified as evidence supporting the division independent of phylogenetic trees.
