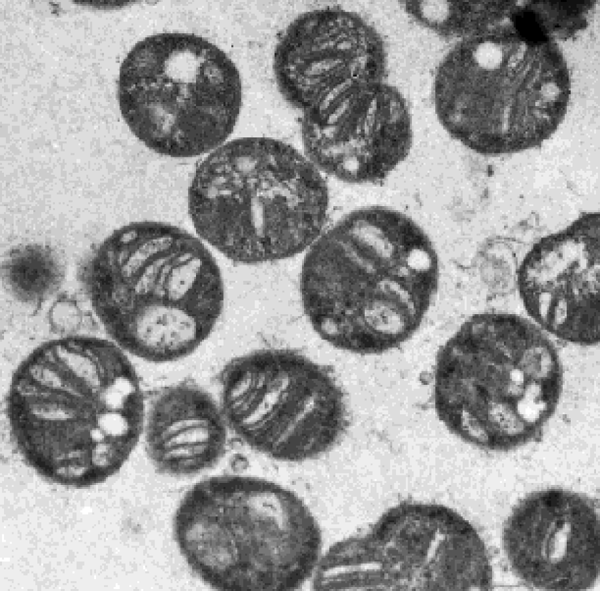
- Methylococcus capsulatus

Scientific classification
- Domain: Bacteria
- Kingdom: Pseudomonadati
- Phylum: Pseudomonadota
- Class: Gammaproteobacteria
- Order: Methylococcales
- Family: Methylococcaceae; Whittenbury and Krieg 1984

Genera
- Methylicorpusculum Saidi-Mehrabad et al. 2020; Methylobacter Bowman et al. 1993; Methylocaldum Bodrossy et al. 1998; Methylococcus Foster and Davis 1966 (Approved Lists 1980); Methylocucumis Pandit and Rahalkar 2019; Methylogaea Geymonat et al. 2011; Methyloglobulus Deutzmann et al. 2015; "Methylolobus" Rahalkar et al. 2020; Methylomagnum Khalifa et al. 2015; Methylomarinum Hirayama et al. 2013; Methylomicrobium Bowman et al. 1995; Methylomonas (ex Leadbetter 1974) Whittenbury and Krieg 1984; Methyloparacoccus Hoefman et al. 2014; Methyloprofundus Tavormina et al. 2015; Methylosarcina Wise et al. 2001; Methylosoma Rahalkar et al. 2007; Methylosphaera Bowman et al. 1998; "Candidatus Methylospira" Danilova et al. 2016; Methyloterricola Frindte et al. 2017; "Methylotetracoccus" Ghashghavi et al. 2019; "Methylovarius" Romanovskaya 1984; Methylovulum Iguchi et al. 2011

= Methylococcaceae =

Family of bacteria

The Methylococcaceae are a family of bacteria that obtain their carbon and energy from methane, called methanotrophs.

They comprise the type I methanotrophs, in contrast to the Methylocystaceae or type II methanotrophs. They belong to Gammaproteobacteria, and are typically given their own order.

The Methylococcaceae have internal membranes in the form of flattened discs, perpendicular to the cell wall. Methane is oxidized to give formaldehyde, which is fixed by a process called the ribulose monophosphate (RuMP) cycle. Here formaldehyde is combined with sugar ribulose, producing hexulose. This, in turn, is broken down to produce glyceraldehyde, which is used to produce new ribulose and other organic compounds. Catabolism does not involve a complete citric acid cycle.

Some species of the Methylococcaceae have formed with certain marine mussels endosymbiotic relationships.
