= Pseudomonas infection =

- Other names: pseudomoniasis; pseudomonosis
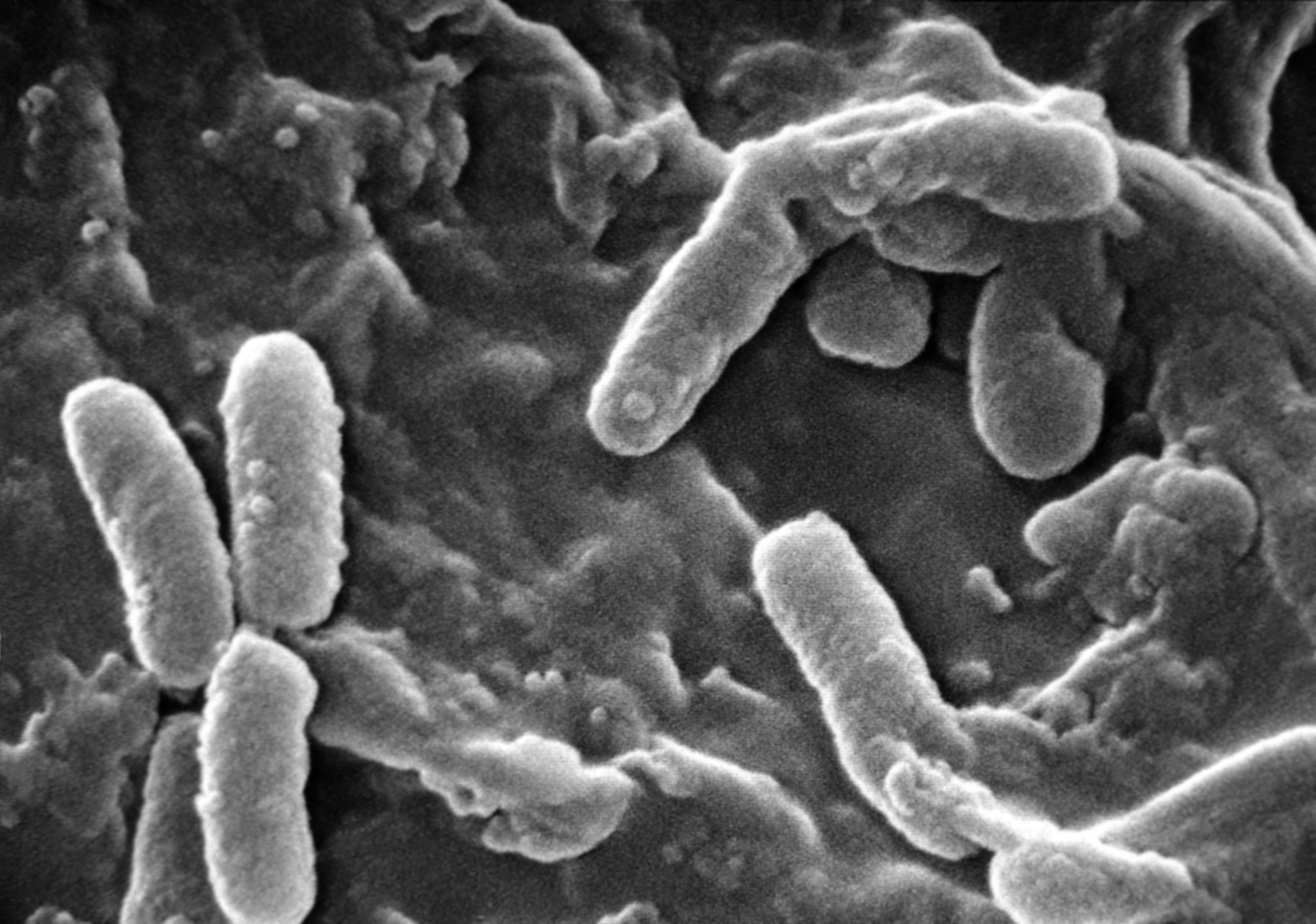
- Scanning electron micrograph of Pseudomonas aeruginosa
- Specialty: Infectious diseases, pulmonology, pediatrics

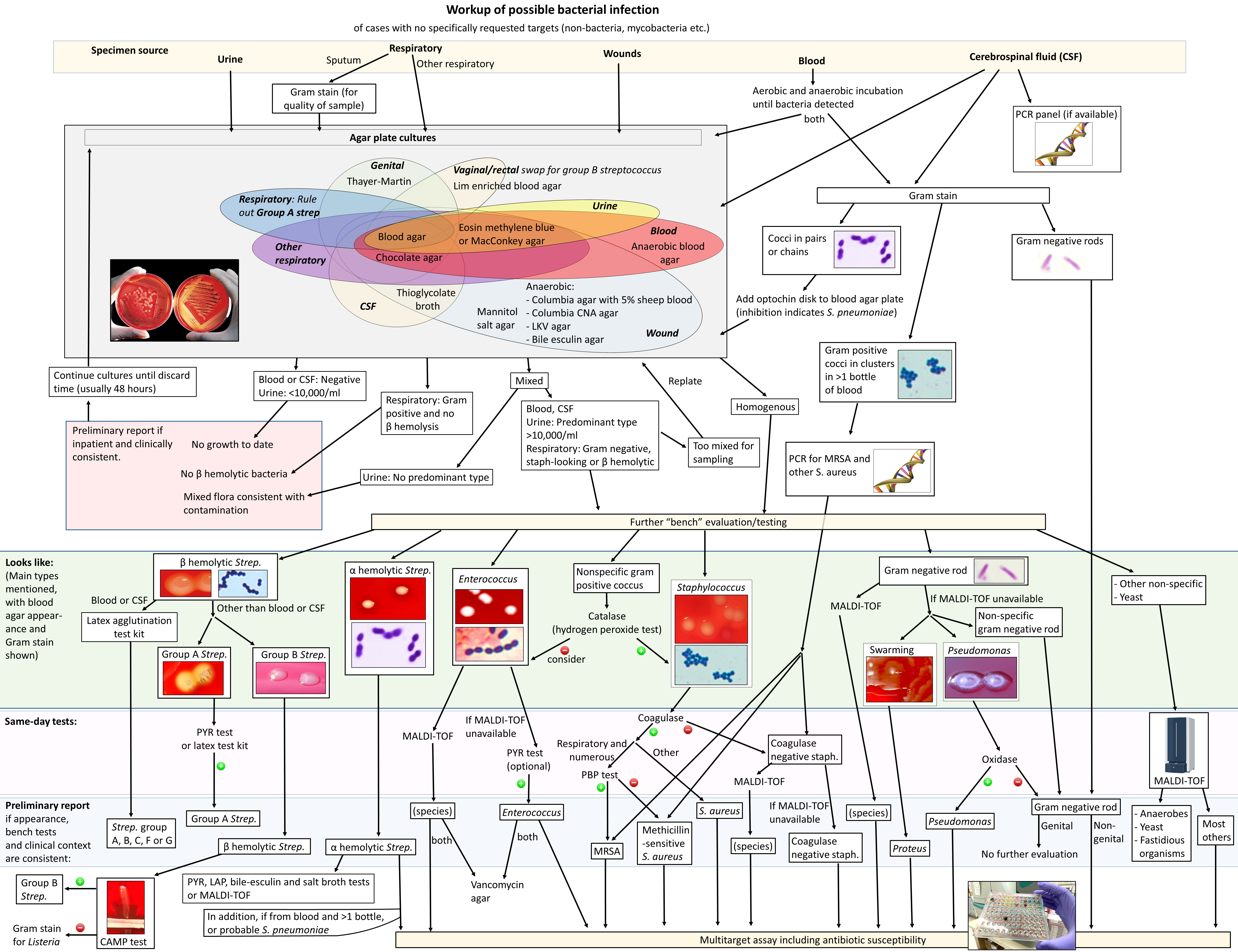
Example of a workup algorithm of possible bacterial infection in cases with no specifically requested targets (non-bacteria, mycobacteria, etc.), with most common situations and agents seen in a New England community hospital setting. As seen in the bottom right quadrant, Pseudomonas infection may be identified by MALDI-TOF if such a machine is available. Otherwise, it usually shows relatively characteristic growth on agar plates.

A Pseudomonas infection is a disease caused by one of the species of the bacterial genus Pseudomonas.

Pseudomonas aeruginosa is an opportunistic human pathogen most commonly infecting immunocompromised patients, such as those with cancer, diabetes, cystic fibrosis, severe burns, AIDS, or people who are very young or elderly. Infection can affect many parts of the body, but infections typically target the respiratory tract, the renal system, and the gastrointestinal system or it can cause blood infection. Symptoms may include bacterial pneumonia, severe coughing, congestion, urinary tract infection (UTI), pain in the ears and eyes, joint pain, neck or back pain, headache, diarrhea, a rash which can include pimples filled with pus, and/or swelling in the eyes. Complications include pneumonia, gangrene, necrotizing fasciitis, compartment syndrome, necrosis, loss of an extremity, and sepsis, which may lead to septic shock and death. In a surveillance study between 1986 and 1989, P. aeruginosa was the third leading cause of all nosocomial (hospital-acquired) infections, and specifically the number one leading cause of hospital-acquired pneumonia and third leading cause of hospital-acquired UTI. Treatment of such infections can be difficult due to multiple antibiotic resistance, and in the United States, there was an increase in MDRPA (Multidrug-resistant Pseudomonas aeruginosa) resistant to ceftazidime, ciprofloxacin, and aminoglycosides, from 0.9% in 1994 to 5.6% in 2002.

P. oryzihabitans can also be a human pathogen, although infections are rare. It can cause peritonitis, endophthalmitis, sepsis and bacteremia. Similar symptoms, although also very rare can be seen by infections of P. luteola.

P. plecoglossicida is a pathogenic species in fish, causing hemorrhagic ascites in the ayu (Plecoglossus altivelis). P. anguilliseptica is also a fish pathogen.

Due to their hemolytic activity, even non-pathogenic species of Pseudomonas can occasionally become a problem in clinical settings, where they have been known to infect blood transfusions.
