= Pseudomonas extremaustralis =

Scientific classification
- Domain: Bacteria
- Kingdom: Pseudomonadati
- Phylum: Pseudomonadota
- Class: Gammaproteobacteria
- Order: Pseudomonadales
- Family: Pseudomonadaceae
- Genus: Pseudomonas
- Species: P. extremaustralis

Binomial name
- Pseudomonas extremaustralis López et al. 2009

Pseudomonas extremaustralis is an extreme cold-resistant (psychrotolerant), Gram-negative bacterium from the genus Pseudomonas. It was first isolated in Antarctica and is known for producing the polymer, polyhydroxyalkanoates (PHAs) that helps with bacterial survival and other biodegradable polymers that exhibit industrial potential. It is also known for its adaptability to cold environments.

== Discovery process ==
=== Initial discovery ===
The discovery of Pseudomonas extremaustralis was serendipitous, as the bacterial strain was actually discovered by accident in 2004. A team of Argentinian scientists, including Nicolás Ayub, Julia Pettinari, Jimena Ruiz, and Nancy López isolated a partial genome sequence of a bacterial species from water sources in the Antarctic Peninsula, specifically in a region called Cierva Point. Their expedition aimed to find various Bacillus species that produced polyhydroxyalkanoates (PHA), a bacterial polymer known to confer significant advantages in bacterial survival. However, during this expedition, the team unexpectedly found and isolated a novel Pseudomonas species with this polymer. The researchers termed this strain Pseudomonas sp.14-3.

In this expedition, the bacteria were isolated, observed, assayed (measured), and screened against known microorganisms to identify their characteristics as well as their preliminary phylogeny (evolutionary relationships to other organisms) and taxonomy (naming/classification). Initially, to isolate the bacteria that produced PHA, known tests were performed by growing the bacteria in an isolated environment known as an agar plate, which only allows the growth of certain organisms based on their characteristics due to compounds in the agar medium (e.g. sodium octanoate in this experiment). They also stained the culture using the dye, Nile Blue, and used a chemical analysis called gas chromatography to confirm their results. Once strains that produced high polyhydroxybutyrate (PHB) levels, a prominent form of PHA, were isolated using these methods, they were then observed via microscopy and subject to thorough biochemical testing. Two methods were used to study the strain's phylogeny. The first method was to compare a specific gene sequence that is highly conserved (highly unchanged) throughout evolutionary history, with changes indicating evolutionary distance. This gene sequence is called the 16S rRNA gene, and it encodes the highly conserved ribonucleic acid (RNA) molecule that contributes to the structure and function of the small subunit of a bacterial ribosome. The second method was DNA-DNA hybridization, a method that compares the overall similarity of the entire genome of two or more samples by observing how well their DNA strands can base pair together. The resulting analysis revealed that the species fit into the Pseudomonas genus.

=== Naming ===
Five years later, in 2009, original researchers Nancy López and Julia Pettinari joined new researchers, Erko Stackebrandt, Paula Tribelli, Markus Põtter, Alexander Steinbüchel, and Beatriz Méndez, to characterize Pseudomonas sp. 14-3. They sampled from the same location and utilized identical methodology to the 2004 study, with the addition of a fatty acid assay (the measurement of fatty acid concentration in a system). Their results confirmed and specified the phylogenetic relationships of this species, or its evolutionary relationships to other bacterial strains. Pseudomonas sp. 14-3 was thus determined to be the first identified strain in the newly isolated species, Pseudomonas extremaustralis.

== Classification of species ==
Both the 2004 study and the 2009 study confirmed, through 16S rRNA sequence similarity (explained in "Initial Discovery"), that the species, Pseudomonas extremaustralis, belongs to the genus Pseudomonas.

=== Phylogeny ===
Both studies also indicated that although the sequence was most similar (over 99.5% similarity in nucleotide bases) for the present species and Pseudomonas veronii, Pseudomonas trivialis, and Pseudomonas poae, these organisms do not form a robust clade (do not all share a common ancestor) in the proposed tree produced by the 2009 research team. This is due to the dissimilarities in the overall genome sequences revealed by DNA-DNA hybridization (explained in "Initial Discovery") and/or marked observable ( phenotypic) differences isolated via biochemical testing, including PHB production. For example, the closest relative of Pseudomonas extremaustralis in terms of DNA-DNA hybridization results and 16S rRNA similarity (explained in "Initial Discovery") is Pseudomonas veronii. However, Pseudomonas veronii lacks the PHB-production ability of Pseudomonas extremaustralis that makes it so adaptable to extreme environments.

== Preliminary characterization ==
=== Physiology and metabolism ===
Pseudomonas extremaustralis is characterized as a Gram-negative, rod-shaped (bacillus-shaped), aerobic (free oxygen-requiring) bacteria that does not form spores (unicellular reproductive units often resistant to extreme environments). It possesses a single flagellum, a tail-like appendage that aids in movement. Under oxidative stress, conditions with toxic oxygen molecules, bacteria exhibit a hyper-flagellated phenotype, meaning they have a greater than average number of flagella, allowing for increased motility, biofilm development (a temporary, enveloped community of microbes), and chemotaxis (movement response to a chemical cue).

Pseudomonas extremaustralis capitalizes on the enzyme nitrate reductase in order to use nitrate as a potential electron acceptor instead of oxygen, making the organism viable in environments with low concentrations of oxygen. The species can also metabolize various length hydrocarbons under low-oxygen (microaerophilic) conditions. Further, the ability to produce storage polymers like polyhydroxyalkanoates (PHAs) confers an evolutionary advantage in harsh environments. Producing PHAs allows the organism to survive harsh and nutrient-scarce conditions. The ability to switch to ethanol oxidation under cold conditions also provides evidence of another adaptation mechanism the species has to endure the harsh Antarctic environment. Given this ability and its natural environment, Pseudomonas extremaustralis is tolerant to extreme cold environments (psychrotolerant). Its ability to use nitrate and produce ammonium gives the species the ecological responsibility of recycling nitrogen in the environment.

=== Genomics ===
The genome size was calculated as 6,143,638 base pairs (bp) with a 60.9% guanine/cytosine content; the genome also contained approximately 5,665 genes, of which 5,544 encode proteins and 121 encode RNA. 10.5% of genes were related to amino acid metabolism, while other genes encoding lipase (enzymes that break down fat) and carboxylesterase (enzymes that break down ester functional groups) are also present. This indicates the organism obtains energy through the metabolism of amino acids and short chain fatty acids. At very low temperatures, genes involved in primary metabolism are repressed in the bacteria and genes involved in ethanol oxidation are upregulated. Pseudomonas extremaustralis also possesses nitrate reductase genes, indicating the species can use nitrogen as an electron acceptor in its metabolism. Genes encoding acetate kinase, potassium transporters, and colanic acid biosynthesis appear to confer a survival advantage under unfavorable conditions by providing osmotic resistance (regulation of particle and water concentrations inside the cell) and aiding in biofilm formation (defined in "Physiology and Metabolism"). These genes were likely acquired through horizontal gene transfer events, which are transfers of genes between two live organisms rather than the passing of genes through reproduction (vertical transfer). Gene duplication was also significant in producing advantageous genes responsible for osmotic-related transport genes and synthesis of glycine-betaine, an osmoprotectant (molecules that help with osmotic pressure).

== Larger implications ==
Pseudomonas extremaustralis possesses the unique ability to digest various hydrocarbons under microaerophilic (low oxygen) conditions, highlighting its potential use in initiatives to clean up diesel fuel contamination in ecosystems where oxygen is limited using microbes. The genes involved in this metabolic pathway should be further studied to understand the strategic potential of this organism to clean up environmental pollutants like oil spills, which aggregate with other factors to endanger the sustainable future of human life on the planet.

Additionally, Pseudomonas extremaustralis are also capable of degrading a very high concentrations of paracetamol (Tylenol®), using it as its sole carbon and energy source. Paracetamol is one of the most used pharmacologic (active drug) compounds in the world, and is also considered an environmental pollutant because it is often found in wastewater and sewage systems that empty into the environment. The species could, thus, be used to combat paracetamol pollution by effectively catabolizing (breaking it down) it into harmless metabolites (end products of metabolism).
