= Pseudomonas mediterranea =

Scientific classification
- Domain: Bacteria
- Kingdom: Pseudomonadati
- Phylum: Pseudomonadota
- Class: Gammaproteobacteria
- Order: Pseudomonadales
- Family: Pseudomonadaceae
- Genus: Pseudomonas
- Species: P. mediterranea

Binomial name
- Pseudomonas mediterranea Catara, et al. 2002

Type strain
- CFBP 5447 ICMP 14184

Species of bacterium

Pseudomonas mediterranea is a bacterium, similar to P. corrugata, that causes tomato pith necrosis. For the phylogenetic analysis of P. corrugata and its closely related phytopathogenic bacterium Pseudomonas mediterranea refer to Trantas et al. 2015.
