= Pseudomonas amygdali =

Scientific classification
- Domain: Bacteria
- Kingdom: Pseudomonadati
- Phylum: Pseudomonadota
- Class: Gammaproteobacteria
- Order: Pseudomonadales
- Family: Pseudomonadaceae
- Genus: Pseudomonas
- Species: P. amygdali

Binomial name
- Pseudomonas amygdali Psallidas and Panagopoulos 1975

Type strain
- ATCC 33614 CCUG 32770; CFBP 3205; CIP 106734; DSM 7298; ICMP 3918; LMG 13184; NCPPB 2607

Pathovars
- P. a. pv. aesculi P. a. pv. amygdali P. a. pv. ciccaronei P. a. pv. dendropanacis P. a. pv. eriobotryae P. a. pv. glycinea P. a. pv. hibisci P. a. pv. lachrymans P. a. pv. mellea P. a. pv. mori P. a. pv. morsprumorum P. a. pv. myricae P. a. pv. phaseolicola P. a. pv. photiniae P. a. pv. sesami P. a. pv. tabaci P. a. pv. ulmi

Species of bacterium

Pseudomonas amygdali is a Gram-negative plant pathogenic bacterium. It is named after its ability to cause disease on almond (Prunus amygdalus) trees. Different analyses, including 16S rRNA analysis, DNA-DNA hybridization, and MLST clearly placed P. amygdali in the P. syringae group together with the species Pseudomonas ficuserectae and Pseudomonas meliae, and 27 pathovars of Pseudomonas syringae/Pseudomonas savastanoi, constituting a single, well-defined phylogenetic group which should be considered as a single species. This phylogenetic group has not been formally named because of the lack of reliable means to differentiate it phenotypically from closely related species, and it is currently known as either genomospecies 2 or phylogroup 3. When it is formally named, the correct name for this new species should be Pseudomonas amygdali, which takes precedence over all the other names of taxa from this group, including Pseudomonas savastanoi, which is and inadequate and confusing name whose use is not recommended .

== Pathovars ==
- Pseudomonas amygdali pv. aesculi infects Buckeye and Horse-chestnut trees (Genus Aesculus).
- Pseudomonas amygdali pv. amygdali was isolated from Prunus amygdalus.
- Pseudomonas amygdali pv. broussonetiae the causal agent of bacterial blight of paper mulberry (Broussonetia kazinoki x B. papyrifera).
- Pseudomonas amygdali pv. castaneae, causal agent of bacterial canker of chestnut (Castanea crenata Sieb. et Zucc.)
- Pseudomonas amygdali pv. cerasicola, causal agent of bacterial gall of cherry tree
- Pseudomonas amygdali pv. ciccaronei causes disease on the carob tree (Ceratonia siliqua).
- Pseudomonas amygdali pv. cunninghamiae causes disease on Cunninghamia lanceolata
- Pseudomonas amygdali pv. daphniphylli, causal agent of bacterial gall of himeyuzuriha (Daphniphyllum teijsmanni Z.)
- Pseudomonas amygdali pv. dendropanacis is pathogenic to Dendropanax trifidus.
- Pseudomonas amygdali pv. eriobotryae infects loquat trees (Eriobotrya japonica).
- Pseudomonas amygdali pv. fraxini
- Pseudomonas amygdali pv. glycinea causes disease of soybeans (Glycine max).
- Pseudomonas amygdali pv. hibisci is pathogenic to Hibiscus plants.
- Pseudomonas amygdali pv. lachrymans causes angular leaf spot on cucumber. Only certain strains of this pathovar belong to this phylogenetic group, whereas the other are classified in genomospecies 3.
- Pseudomonas amygdali pv. mellea causes disease on tobacco plants.
- Pseudomonas amygdali pv. mori is pathogenic on mulberry trees.
- Pseudomonas amygdali pv. morsprunorum causes disease on cherries and plums. Only certain strains of this pathovar belong to this phylogenetic group, whereas the other are classified in genomospecies 3.
- Pseudomonas amygdali pv. myricae was first isolated on Myrica trees.
- Pseudomonas amygdali pv. nerii
- Pseudomonas amygdali pv. phaseolicola is pathogenic to the common bean.
- Pseudomonas amygdali pv. photiniae causes disease on Photinia species.
- Pseudomonas amygdali pv. retacarpa
- Pseudomonas amygdali pv. raphiolepidis
- Pseudomonas amygdali pv. savastanoi
- Pseudomonas amygdali pv. sesami infects sesame plants.
- Pseudomonas amygdali pv. ulmi was first isolated on elm trees.
