= Pseudomonas knackmussii =

Scientific classification
- Domain: Bacteria
- Kingdom: Pseudomonadati
- Phylum: Pseudomonadota
- Class: Gammaproteobacteria
- Order: Pseudomonadales
- Family: Pseudomonadaceae
- Genus: Pseudomonas
- Species: P. knackmussii

Binomial name
- Pseudomonas knackmussii Stoltz, et al. 2007

Species of bacterium

Pseudomonas knackmussii is a Gram-negative, polarly flagellated, motile, short rod bacterium isolated from a sewage treatment plant in Göttingen, Germany. It is the first bacterium used to study the degradation of haloaromatic compounds. It is named after Hans-Joachim Knackmuss. The type strain is DSM 6978.
