= Pseudomonas coenobios =

Scientific classification
- Domain: Bacteria
- Kingdom: Pseudomonadati
- Phylum: Pseudomonadota
- Class: Gammaproteobacteria
- Order: Pseudomonadales
- Family: Pseudomonadaceae
- Genus: Pseudomonas
- Species: P. coenobios

Binomial name
- Pseudomonas coenobios ZoBell and Upham 1944

Type strain
- ATCC 14402

Species of bacterium

Pseudomonas coenobios is a Gram-negative, non-sporulating, motile, rod marine bacterium. The type strain is ATCC 14402.
