= Pseudomonas umsongensis =

Scientific classification
- Domain: Bacteria
- Kingdom: Pseudomonadati
- Phylum: Pseudomonadota
- Class: Gammaproteobacteria
- Order: Pseudomonadales
- Family: Pseudomonadaceae
- Genus: Pseudomonas
- Species: P. umsongensis

Binomial name
- Pseudomonas umsongensis Kwon, et al. 2003

Species of bacterium

Pseudomonas umsongensis is a Gram-negative, non-non-spore-forming, motile, rod-shaped bacterium with a single polar flagella. It is yellow-white in color, and was isolated from the soil in the Umsong region of Korea. The type strain is LMG 21317.
