= Pseudomonas resinovorans =

Scientific classification
- Domain: Bacteria
- Kingdom: Pseudomonadati
- Phylum: Pseudomonadota
- Class: Gammaproteobacteria
- Order: Pseudomonadales
- Family: Pseudomonadaceae
- Genus: Pseudomonas
- Species: P. resinovorans

Binomial name
- Pseudomonas resinovorans Delaporte, et al. 1961

Type strain
- ATCC 14235 CCUG 2473 and 4439; CFBP 5590; CIP 61.9; LMG 2274; NRRL B-2649

Species of bacterium

Pseudomonas resinovorans is a Gram-negative, soil bacterium that is commonly found in the lubricating oils of wood mills. It is able to degrade carbazole, and as such, may be used in bioremediation. Based on 16S rRNA analysis, P. resinovorans has been placed in the P. aeruginosa group.
