= Pseudomonas agarici =

Scientific classification
- Domain: Bacteria
- Kingdom: Pseudomonadati
- Phylum: Pseudomonadota
- Class: Gammaproteobacteria
- Order: Pseudomonadales
- Family: Pseudomonadaceae
- Genus: Pseudomonas
- Species: P. agarici

Binomial name
- Pseudomonas agarici Young 1970

Type strain
- ATCC 25941 CCUG 32769; CFBP 2063; CIP 106703; DSM 11810; ICMP 2656; JCM 12566; LMG 2112; NCPPB 2289

Species of bacterium

Pseudomonas agarici is a Gram-negative soil bacterium that causes drippy gill in mushrooms (Agaricus bisporus). It was first isolated in New Zealand. P. agarici could not be grouped based on 16S rRNA analysis, so it is designated incertae sedis in the genus Pseudomonas.
