= Pseudomonas oleovorans =

Scientific classification
- Domain: Bacteria
- Kingdom: Pseudomonadati
- Phylum: Pseudomonadota
- Class: Gammaproteobacteria
- Order: Pseudomonadales
- Family: Pseudomonadaceae
- Genus: Pseudomonas
- Species: P. oleovorans

Binomial name
- Pseudomonas oleovorans Lee and Chandler 1941

Type strain
- ATCC 8062 CCUG 2087; CFBP 5589; CIP 59.11; DSM 1045; JCM 11598; LMG 2229; NBRC 13583; NCTC 10692; NRRL B-778; VKM B-1522

Synonyms
- Pseudomonas pseudoalcaligenes Stanier 1966 (Approved Lists 1980)

Species of bacterium

Pseudomonas oleovorans is a Gram-negative, methylotrophic bacterium that is a source of rubredoxin (part of the hydroxylation-epoxidation system). It was first isolated in water-oil emulsions used as lubricants and cooling agents for cutting metals.
