= Pseudomonas psychrophila =

Scientific classification
- Domain: Bacteria
- Kingdom: Pseudomonadati
- Phylum: Pseudomonadota
- Class: Gammaproteobacteria
- Order: Pseudomonadales
- Family: Pseudomonadaceae
- Genus: Pseudomonas
- Species: P. psychrophila

Binomial name
- Pseudomonas psychrophila Yumoto, et al. 2001

Species of bacterium

Pseudomonas psychrophila is a psychrophilic, Gram-negative, aerobic, straight rod bacterium with polar flagella. The type strain is JCM 10889.
