= Pseudomonas antarctica =

Scientific classification
- Domain: Bacteria
- Kingdom: Pseudomonadati
- Phylum: Pseudomonadota
- Class: Gammaproteobacteria
- Order: Pseudomonadales
- Family: Pseudomonadaceae
- Genus: Pseudomonas
- Species: P. antarctica

Binomial name
- Pseudomonas antarctica Reddy, et al., 2004

Type strain
- CCUG 49625 DSM 15318; MTCC 4992

Species of bacterium

Pseudomonas antarctica is a psychrophilic, Gram-negative, motile with a polar flagellum, rod-shaped bacterium isolated from cyanobacterial mats in Antarctica.
