= Pseudomonas parafulva =

Scientific classification
- Domain: Bacteria
- Kingdom: Pseudomonadati
- Phylum: Pseudomonadota
- Class: Gammaproteobacteria
- Order: Pseudomonadales
- Family: Pseudomonadaceae
- Genus: Pseudomonas
- Species: P. parafulva

Binomial name
- Pseudomonas parafulva Uchino, et al. 2001

Type strain
- JCM 11244 NBRC 16636; NRIC 0501

Species of bacterium

Pseudomonas parafulva is a Gram-negative bacteria. It is epiphytic and has been demonstrated to antagonise the fungal plant pathogen Botrytis cinerea.
