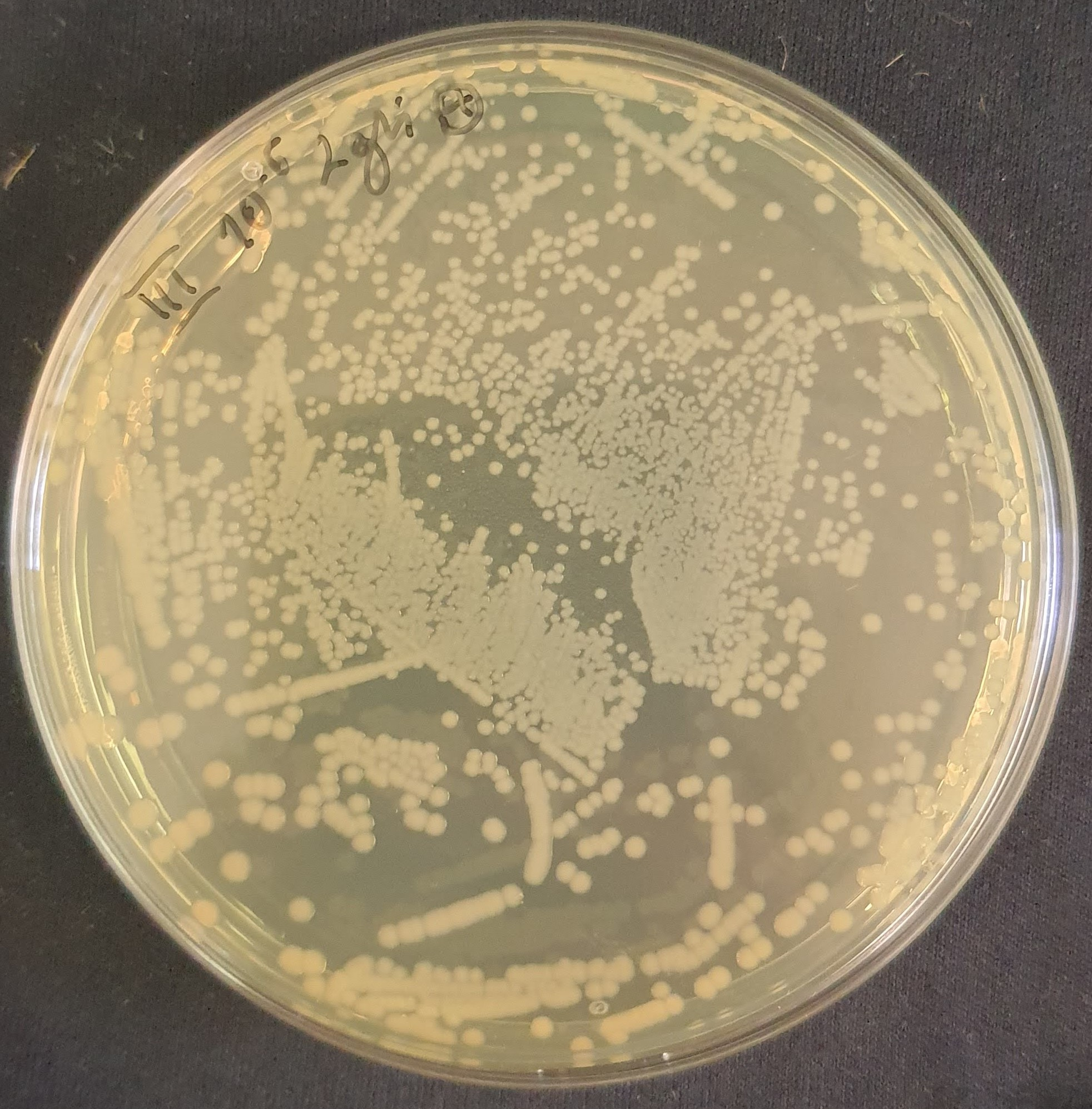
- Pseudomonas gessardii on LB agar

Scientific classification
- Domain: Bacteria
- Kingdom: Pseudomonadati
- Phylum: Pseudomonadota
- Class: Gammaproteobacteria
- Order: Pseudomonadales
- Family: Pseudomonadaceae
- Genus: Pseudomonas
- Species: P. gessardii

Binomial name
- Pseudomonas gessardii Verhille, et al., 1999

Type strain
- CIP 105469 CFML 95-251

= Pseudomonas gessardii =

Species of bacterium

Pseudomonas gessardii is a fluorescent, Gram-negative, rod-shaped bacterium isolated from natural mineral waters in France. Based on 16S rRNA analysis, P. gessardii has been placed in the P. fluorescens group.

== Habitat ==
While as mentioned previously this bacterium was first isolated from natural mineral water, it is also found in other environments such as sewage or soil. These bacteria have a wide range of thermal tolerance as they can grow at temperatures ranging from 4 to 35°C with an optimum at 30°C.

== Industrial applications ==
Pseudomonas gessardii bacteria are currently used in many industrial processes. Examples of these applications include bioremediation of contaminated industrial sites through degradation of naphthalene and biological reduction of chromium for its removal from the environment, production of lipase active in low pH conditions used in the food, leather and medical industries and production of xylitol from organic agro-industrial waste.

This bacterium also has the potential to function as a plant growth promoter. It has been proven that inoculation of soil contaminated with lead (Pb) with these bacteria causes its immobilization, increased plant growth, increased chlorophyll content and yields. Another beneficial feature of these bacteria is their ability to protect the plants with which they form symbiosis against pathogenic microorganisms. This is due to its ability to produce compounds such as chitinases with fungicidal activity or lipases and proteases with antibacterial activity. Additional benefits of treating plants with these bacteria result from the fact that they produce siderophores increasing the content of iron available to plants. Another feature of this species is its ability to form plant growth-promoting bacterial consortia with other beneficial bacteria, in which these microorganisms interact with each other in a way that maximizes their beneficial effects on the plants. These consortiums allow for more effective fixation of atmospheric nitrogen and increasein the bioavailability of elements such as phosphorus and potassium in the soil compared to single-species populations.
