= Pseudomonas segitis =

Scientific classification
- Domain: Bacteria
- Kingdom: Pseudomonadati
- Phylum: Pseudomonadota
- Class: Gammaproteobacteria
- Order: Pseudomonadales
- Family: Pseudomonadaceae
- Genus: Pseudomonas
- Species: P. segitis

Binomial name
- Pseudomonas segitis Park, et al. 2006

Species of bacterium

Pseudomonas segitis is a Gram-negative, aerobic soil bacterium found in Korea. The type strain is IMSNU 14101.
