= Pseudomonas halodurans =

Scientific classification
- Domain: Bacteria
- Kingdom: Pseudomonadati
- Phylum: Pseudomonadota
- Class: Gammaproteobacteria
- Order: Pseudomonadales
- Family: Pseudomonadaceae
- Genus: Pseudomonas
- Species: P. halodurans

Binomial name
- Pseudomonas halodurans Cuhel et al. 1981

Species of bacterium

"Pseudomonas halodurans" is a species of pseudomonad bacteria.
