= Pseudomonas excibis =

Scientific classification
- Domain: Bacteria
- Kingdom: Pseudomonadati
- Phylum: Pseudomonadota
- Class: Gammaproteobacteria
- Order: Pseudomonadales
- Family: Pseudomonadaceae
- Genus: Pseudomonas
- Species: P. excibis

Binomial name
- Pseudomonas excibis Steinhaus

Species of bacterium

Pseudomonas excibis is a gram-negative, rod bacterium first isolated from the gastric caeca of the cactus bug (Chelinidea vittiger). The type strain is ATCC 12293.
