= Pseudomonas vancouverensis =

Scientific classification
- Domain: Bacteria
- Kingdom: Pseudomonadati
- Phylum: Pseudomonadota
- Class: Gammaproteobacteria
- Order: Pseudomonadales
- Family: Pseudomonadaceae
- Genus: Pseudomonas
- Species: P. vancouverensis

Binomial name
- Pseudomonas vancouverensis Mohn, et al. 1999

Type strain
- ATCC 700688

Species of bacterium

Pseudomonas vancouverensis is a Gram-negative soil bacterium that grows on pulp mill effluents with resin acids. It was first isolated in Canada.

It was further engineered for one-carbon (C1) feedstock assimilation and polyhydroxyalkanoate accumulation.
