= Pseudomonas cedrina =

Scientific classification
- Domain: Bacteria
- Kingdom: Pseudomonadati
- Phylum: Pseudomonadota
- Class: Gammaproteobacteria
- Order: Pseudomonadales
- Family: Pseudomonadaceae
- Genus: Pseudomonas
- Species: P. cedrina

Binomial name
- Pseudomonas cedrina corrig. Dabboussi, et al., 1999

Type strain
- CIP 105541

Synonyms
- Pseudomonas cedrella Dabboussi, et al., 1999

Species of bacterium

Pseudomonas cedrina is a Gram-negative, rod-shaped bacterium isolated from spring waters in Lebanon. Based on 16S rRNA analysis, P. cedrina has been placed in the P. fluorescens group.
