= Pseudomonas taiwanensis =

Scientific classification
- Domain: Bacteria
- Kingdom: Pseudomonadati
- Phylum: Pseudomonadota
- Class: Gammaproteobacteria
- Order: Pseudomonadales
- Family: Pseudomonadaceae
- Genus: Pseudomonas
- Species: P. taiwanensis

Binomial name
- Pseudomonas taiwanensis Wang et al. 2010

Species of bacterium

Pseudomonas taiwanensis is a species of gram-negative bacteria from the family Pseudomonadaceae. It was first isolated from the soil in Taiwan. P. taiwanensis's genome was sequenced in 2021.

== Taxonomy ==
Pseudomonas taiwanensis was isolated from soil taken from Tamkang University in 2010. It's specific epithet refers to Taiwan, the country from which it was first isolated.

== Description ==
Phylogenetic analysis of the 16s rRNA sequence places P. taiwanensis in the Pseudomonas putida group.
