= Pseudomonas acidophila =

Scientific classification
- Domain: Bacteria
- Kingdom: Pseudomonadati
- Phylum: Pseudomonadota
- Class: Gammaproteobacteria
- Order: Pseudomonadales
- Family: Pseudomonadaceae
- Genus: Pseudomonas
- Species: P. acidophila

Binomial name
- Pseudomonas acidophila Imdada et al. 1980

Species of bacterium

Pseudomonas acidophila is a Gram-negative soil bacterium that produces the beta-lactam antibiotic, sulfazecin, as well as bulgecins. It was first isolated in Japan. Because this organism is patented, it is not officially recognized as a legitimate Pseudomonas species, and therefore has no type strain. It is available, however, through the American Type Culture Collection.
