= Pseudomonas guryensis =

Scientific classification
- Domain: Bacteria
- Kingdom: Pseudomonadati
- Phylum: Pseudomonadota
- Class: Gammaproteobacteria
- Order: Pseudomonadales
- Family: Pseudomonadaceae
- Genus: Pseudomonas
- Species: P. guryensis

Binomial name
- Pseudomonas guryensis Kim et al. 2021

Type strain
- SR9

Species of bacterium

Pseudomonas guryensis is a Gram-negative, aerobic and rod-shaped bacterium from the genus of Pseudomonas which has been isolated from soil.
