= Pseudomonas peli =

Scientific classification
- Domain: Bacteria
- Kingdom: Pseudomonadati
- Phylum: Pseudomonadota
- Class: Gammaproteobacteria
- Order: Pseudomonadales
- Family: Pseudomonadaceae
- Genus: Pseudomonas
- Species: P. peli

Binomial name
- Pseudomonas peli Vanparys, et al., 2006

Species of bacterium

Pseudomonas peli is a Gram-negative, non-fluorescent, non-sporulating, motile, rod-shaped bacterium isolated from a commercially available nitrifying inoculum used in aquaculture. The type strain is LMG 23201. After approximately 24 hours of growth at 28 °C in Tryptic Soy Agar medium, Pseudomonas peli colonies are 1–2 mm in diameter, beige to yellow in color and have non-uniform edges while the cells themselves are rod shaped (width near 1μm and length between 2-3 μm) with rounded ends. Cells are motile, do not form spores, are non-fluorescent and they have not been observed to grow anaerobically.
