= Pseudomonas oryzae =

Scientific classification
- Domain: Bacteria
- Kingdom: Pseudomonadati
- Phylum: Pseudomonadota
- Class: Gammaproteobacteria
- Order: Pseudomonadales
- Family: Pseudomonadaceae
- Genus: Pseudomonas
- Species: P. oryzae

Binomial name
- Pseudomonas oryzae Girard et al. 2022

Type strain
- CGMCC 1.12417 KCTC 32247; WM-3

Species of bacterium

"Pseudomonas oryzae" is a species of pseudomonad bacteria.
