= Pseudomonas salomonii =

Scientific classification
- Domain: Bacteria
- Kingdom: Pseudomonadati
- Phylum: Pseudomonadota
- Class: Gammaproteobacteria
- Order: Pseudomonadales
- Family: Pseudomonadaceae
- Genus: Pseudomonas
- Species: P. salomonii

Binomial name
- Pseudomonas salomonii Gardan, et al. 2002

Species of bacterium

Pseudomonas salomonii is a Gram-negative bacterium that infects garlic (Allium sativum). The type strain is CFBP 2022.
