= Pseudomonas sesami =

Scientific classification
- Domain: Bacteria
- Kingdom: Pseudomonadati
- Phylum: Pseudomonadota
- Class: Gammaproteobacteria
- Order: Pseudomonadales
- Family: Pseudomonadaceae
- Genus: Pseudomonas
- Species: P. sesami

Binomial name
- Pseudomonas sesami Madhaiyan et al. 2017

Type strain
- KCTC 22518 NCIMB 14519; SI-P133

Species of bacterium

Pseudomonas sesami is a species of pseudomonad bacteria originally isolated from sesame (Sesamum indicum).
