= Pseudomonas libanensis =

Scientific classification
- Domain: Bacteria
- Kingdom: Pseudomonadati
- Phylum: Pseudomonadota
- Class: Gammaproteobacteria
- Order: Pseudomonadales
- Family: Pseudomonadaceae
- Genus: Pseudomonas
- Species: P. libanensis

Binomial name
- Pseudomonas libanensis Dabboussi, et al. 1999

Type strain
- CCUG 43190 CFML 96-195; CIP 105460

Species of bacterium

Pseudomonas libanensis is a Gram-negative, rod-shaped, fluorescent, motile bacterium isolated from natural springs in Lebanon. Based on 16S rRNA analysis, P. libanensis has been placed in the P. fluorescens group.
