= Pseudomonas blatchfordae =

Scientific classification
- Domain: Bacteria
- Kingdom: Pseudomonadati
- Phylum: Pseudomonadota
- Class: Gammaproteobacteria
- Order: Pseudomonadales
- Family: Pseudomonadaceae
- Genus: Pseudomonas
- Species: P. blatchfordae

Binomial name
- Pseudomonas blatchfordae Blatchford and Schuster 1980

Type strain
- CFBP 3280 NCPPB 3374

Species of bacterium

"Pseudomonas blatchfordae" is a Gram-negative soil bacteria isolated from tomato pith necrosis and the common bean (Phaseolus vulgaris). It is not a validly recognized species. Based on 16S rRNA analysis, it falls within the P. fluorescens group.
