= Pseudomonas gelidicola =

Scientific classification
- Domain: Bacteria
- Kingdom: Pseudomonadati
- Phylum: Pseudomonadota
- Class: Gammaproteobacteria
- Order: Pseudomonadales
- Family: Pseudomonadaceae
- Genus: Pseudomonas
- Species: P. gelidicola

Binomial name
- Pseudomonas gelidicola Kadota 1951

Species of bacterium

Pseudomonas gelidicola is a Gram-negative marine bacteria. The type strain is IAM 1127.
