= Pseudomonas jessenii =

Scientific classification
- Domain: Bacteria
- Kingdom: Pseudomonadati
- Phylum: Pseudomonadota
- Class: Gammaproteobacteria
- Order: Pseudomonadales
- Family: Pseudomonadaceae
- Genus: Pseudomonas
- Species: P. jessenii

Binomial name
- Pseudomonas jessenii Verhille, et al., 1999

Species of bacterium

Pseudomonas jessenii is a fluorescent, Gram-negative, rod-shaped bacterium isolated from natural mineral waters in France. The type strain is CIP 105274.
