= Pseudomonas rhodesiae =

Scientific classification
- Domain: Bacteria
- Kingdom: Pseudomonadati
- Phylum: Pseudomonadota
- Class: Gammaproteobacteria
- Order: Pseudomonadales
- Family: Pseudomonadaceae
- Genus: Pseudomonas
- Species: P. rhodesiae

Binomial name
- Pseudomonas rhodesiae Coroler, et al. 1997

Type strain
- CCUG 38732 CIP 104664; DSM 14020; JCM 11940; LMG 17764

Species of bacterium

Pseudomonas rhodesiae is a Gram-negative, rod-shaped bacterium isolated from natural mineral waters. Based on 16S rRNA analysis, P. rhodesiae has been placed in the P. fluorescens group.
