= Pseudomonas thivervalensis =

Scientific classification
- Domain: Bacteria
- Kingdom: Pseudomonadati
- Phylum: Pseudomonadota
- Class: Gammaproteobacteria
- Order: Pseudomonadales
- Family: Pseudomonadaceae
- Genus: Pseudomonas
- Species: P. thivervalensis

Binomial name
- Pseudomonas thivervalensis Achouak, et al. 2000

Type strain
- CFBP 5754 DSM 13194; JCM 11941

Species of bacterium

Pseudomonas thivervalensis is a Gram-negative soil bacterium that infects the roots of Arabidopsis thaliana. Based on 16S rRNA analysis, P. thivervalensis falls within the P. fluorescens group. It derives its name from the fact that it was first isolated in Thiverval, France.
