= Pseudomonas cuatrocienegasensis =

Scientific classification
- Domain: Bacteria
- Kingdom: Pseudomonadati
- Phylum: Pseudomonadota
- Class: Gammaproteobacteria
- Order: Pseudomonadales
- Family: Pseudomonadaceae
- Genus: Pseudomonas
- Species: P. cuatrocienegasensis

Binomial name
- Pseudomonas cuatrocienegasensis Escalante et al. 2009

Type strain
- 1N

Synonyms
- Pseudomonas caenicarum

Species of bacterium

Pseudomonas cuatrocienegasensis is a Gram-negative, non-spore-forming and rod-shaped bacterium from the genus of Pseudomonas.
