= Pseudomonas aureofaciens =

Scientific classification
- Domain: Bacteria
- Kingdom: Pseudomonadati
- Phylum: Pseudomonadota
- Class: Gammaproteobacteria
- Order: Pseudomonadales
- Family: Pseudomonadaceae
- Genus: Pseudomonas
- Species: P. aureofaciens

Binomial name
- Pseudomonas aureofaciens Kluyver 1956

Type strain
- ATCC 13985 CFBP 2133; LMG 1245

Synonyms
- Pseudomonas polychromogenes Kluyver 1956

Species of bacterium

Pseudomonas aureofaciens is a yellowish, aerobic, Gram-negative, motile, polar-flagellated, rod-shaped bacterium isolated from clay near the River Maas. Based on 16S rRNA analysis, P. aureofaciens has been placed in the P. chlororaphis group.
