= Pseudomonas perolens =

Scientific classification
- Domain: Bacteria
- Kingdom: Pseudomonadati
- Phylum: Pseudomonadota
- Class: Gammaproteobacteria
- Order: Pseudomonadales
- Family: Pseudomonadaceae
- Genus: Pseudomonas
- Species: P. perolens

Binomial name
- Pseudomonas perolens Szybalski 1950

Species of bacterium

Pseudomonas perolens is a Gram-negative, non-sporulating, motile, rod bacterium that is known to cause mustiness in eggs in Poland. The type strain is ATCC 10757.
