= Pseudomonas cremoricolorata =

Scientific classification
- Domain: Bacteria
- Kingdom: Pseudomonadati
- Phylum: Pseudomonadota
- Class: Gammaproteobacteria
- Order: Pseudomonadales
- Family: Pseudomonadaceae
- Genus: Pseudomonas
- Species: P. cremoricolorata

Binomial name
- Pseudomonas cremoricolorata Uchino, et al. 2001

Type strain
- JCM 11246 NBRC 16634; NRIC 0181

Species of bacterium

Pseudomonas cremoricolorata is a Gram-negative bacteria found living on plants.
