= Pseudomonas reptilivora =

Scientific classification
- Domain: Bacteria
- Kingdom: Pseudomonadati
- Phylum: Pseudomonadota
- Class: Gammaproteobacteria
- Order: Pseudomonadales
- Family: Pseudomonadaceae
- Genus: Pseudomonas
- Species: P. reptilivora

Binomial name
- Pseudomonas reptilivora Caldwell and Ryerson 1940

Species of bacterium

Pseudomonas reptilivora is a fluorescent, yellow-green, Gram-negative, rod-shaped, non-spore-forming, multiple polar flagellated, motile bacterium that is pathogenic to reptiles. It was originally isolated in Gila monsters (Heloderma suspectum), horned lizards (Phrynosoma solare), and chuckawallas (Sauromalus ater). The type strain is ATCC 14836.

== Gluconic acid production ==
P. reptilivora has demonstrated a remarkable ability to convert glucose into gluconic acid, a valuable organic acid widely used in the food, pharmaceutical, and eco-friendly cleaning industries. This bioconversion occurs through an oxidative process catalyzed by membrane-bound dehydrogenases, particularly pyrroloquinoline quinone (PQQ)-dependent glucose dehydrogenase.

== Metabolic pathway ==
Gluconic acid is synthesized via direct oxidation of glucose in the periplasmic space, bypassing central metabolic pathways which is further oxidized to 2-ketogluconic acid by gluconic acid dehydrogenase, however, another enzyme (2-ketogluconate dehydrogenase) transforms 2-ketogluconic acid into 5-ketogluconic acid at an optimal pH 5.5 and 6.0.

The enzymatic reaction follows:

Glucose + O^{2} → Gluconic acid + H_{2}O_{2}

Gluconic acid → 2-ketogluconic acid → 5-ketogluconic acid

== Biotechnological Relevance ==
Gluconic acid produced by P. reptilivora offers several advantages:

- High specificity: The conversion produces minimal byproducts, simplifying downstream purification.
- Mild process conditions: No extreme temperatures or harsh chemicals are needed.
- Low-cost substrates: It can be produced from glucose, glycerol, or agro-industrial carbohydrate-rich wastes.
- Experimental Evidence: In controlled fermentations with glucose concentrations of 1–5% (w/v).

P. reptilivora B-6bs has shown: High conversion yields of glucose to gluconic acid within 48 hours. Co-production of 5-keto-D-gluconate, a secondary product formed by further oxidation. Sensitivity to oxygen transfer rates, with higher productivity observed at 3.3 vvm compared to 2.5 vvm. Production has been confirmed through UV-Vis spectrophotometry and thin-layer chromatography (TLC) techniques.

== Known strains ==
- P. reptilivora
- P. reptilivora M8 produces antibiotics.
- P. reptilivora B-6 produces 2-ketogluconic acid.
- P. reptilivora B-6bs produces 5-ketogluconic acid, proline, glutamic acid and gluconic acid
