= Pseudomonas suis =

Scientific classification
- Domain: Bacteria
- Kingdom: Pseudomonadati
- Phylum: Pseudomonadota
- Class: Gammaproteobacteria
- Order: Pseudomonadales
- Family: Pseudomonadaceae
- Genus: Pseudomonas
- Species: P. suis

Binomial name
- Pseudomonas suis Woods 1930

Species of bacterium

Pseudomonas suis is a Gram-negative bacterium that causes croupous pneumonia of swine (genus Sus) from which it derives its name. It was first isolated in the Philippines. The type strain is ATCC 11729.
