= Pseudomonas melophthora =

Scientific classification
- Domain: Bacteria
- Kingdom: Pseudomonadati
- Phylum: Pseudomonadota
- Class: Gammaproteobacteria
- Order: Pseudomonadales
- Family: Pseudomonadaceae
- Genus: Pseudomonas
- Species: P. melophthora

Binomial name
- Pseudomonas melophthora Allen and Riker 1932

Species of bacterium

The bacterial species "Pseudomonas melophthora", can be found in the apple maggot, Rhagoletis pomonella. This can be considered a form of symbiosis as, amongst other things, the bacteria has the ability to degrade insecticides and so offers a form of protection to the apple maggot.
