= Pseudomonas delhiensis =

Scientific classification
- Domain: Bacteria
- Kingdom: Pseudomonadati
- Phylum: Pseudomonadota
- Class: Gammaproteobacteria
- Order: Pseudomonadales
- Family: Pseudomonadaceae
- Genus: Pseudomonas
- Species: P. delhiensis

Binomial name
- Pseudomonas delhiensis Prakash, et al. 2007

Species of bacterium

Pseudomonas delhiensis is a Gram-negative bacterium isolated from the dumping site of fly ash of a power plant in Delhi, India. The type strain is MTCC 7601.
