= Pseudomonas tritici =

Scientific classification
- Domain: Bacteria
- Kingdom: Pseudomonadati
- Phylum: Pseudomonadota
- Class: Gammaproteobacteria
- Order: Pseudomonadales
- Family: Pseudomonadaceae
- Genus: Pseudomonas
- Species: P. tritici

Binomial name
- Pseudomonas tritici Girard et al. 2022

Type strain
- CFBP 8883 LMG 32048; SWRI145

Species of bacterium

Pseudomonas tritici is a species of pseudomonad bacteria.
