= Pseudomonas borbori =

Scientific classification
- Domain: Bacteria
- Kingdom: Pseudomonadati
- Phylum: Pseudomonadota
- Class: Gammaproteobacteria
- Order: Pseudomonadales
- Family: Pseudomonadaceae
- Genus: Pseudomonas
- Species: P. borbori

Binomial name
- Pseudomonas borbori Vanparys, et al., 2006

Type strain
- DSM 17834 LMG 23199

Species of bacterium

Pseudomonas borbori is an aerobic, Gram-negative, nonfluorescent, nonsporulating, motile, rod-shaped bacterium isolated from a nitrifying inoculum used in aquaculture. Based on 16S rRNA phylogenetic analysis, P. borbori was placed in the P. aeruginosa group.
