= Pseudomonas thermotolerans =

Scientific classification
- Domain: Bacteria
- Kingdom: Pseudomonadati
- Phylum: Pseudomonadota
- Class: Gammaproteobacteria
- Order: Pseudomonadales
- Family: Pseudomonadaceae
- Genus: Pseudomonas
- Species: P. thermotolerans

Binomial name
- Pseudomonas thermotolerans Manaia and Moore 2002

Species of bacterium

Pseudomonas thermotolerans is a Gram-negative, aerobic, rod-shaped bacterium found in the industrial cooking water of a cork-processing plant. It is capable of surviving at 47 °C (117 °F), hence its name. The type strain is DSM 14292.
