= Pseudomonas straminea =

Scientific classification
- Domain: Bacteria
- Kingdom: Pseudomonadati
- Phylum: Pseudomonadota
- Class: Gammaproteobacteria
- Order: Pseudomonadales
- Family: Pseudomonadaceae
- Genus: Pseudomonas
- Species: P. straminea

Binomial name
- Pseudomonas straminea Iizuka and Komagata 1963

Type strain
- ATCC 33636 CCUG 12539; CIP 106745; IAM 1598; JCM 2783; NBRC 16665

Synonyms
- Pseudomonas ochracea (Zimmermann 1890) Chester 1901

Species of bacterium

Pseudomonas straminea is a Gram-negative, rod bacterium that includes strains formerly identified as P. ochracea. Based on 16S rRNA analysis, P. straminea has been placed in the P. aeruginosa group.
