= Pseudomonas mucidolens =

Scientific classification
- Domain: Bacteria
- Kingdom: Pseudomonadati
- Phylum: Pseudomonadota
- Class: Gammaproteobacteria
- Order: Pseudomonadales
- Family: Pseudomonadaceae
- Genus: Pseudomonas
- Species: P. mucidolens

Binomial name
- Pseudomonas mucidolens Levine and Anderson 1932

Type strain
- ATCC 4685 CCUG 1424; CIP 103298; JCM 2781; LMG 2223; NCTC 8068; NRRL B-16

Species of bacterium

Pseudomonas mucidolens is a Gram-negative, non-sporulating, motile, rod bacterium that causes mustiness in eggs. Based on 16S rRNA analysis, P. mucidolens has been placed in the P. fluorescens group.
