= Pseudomonas kilonensis =

Scientific classification
- Domain: Bacteria
- Kingdom: Pseudomonadati
- Phylum: Pseudomonadota
- Class: Gammaproteobacteria
- Order: Pseudomonadales
- Family: Pseudomonadaceae
- Genus: Pseudomonas
- Species: P. kilonensis

Binomial name
- Pseudomonas kilonensis Sikorski, et al. 2001

Species of bacterium

Pseudomonas kilonensis is a Gram-negative soil bacterium isolated from agricultural soil in Germany. The type strain is DSM 13647.
