= Pseudomonas vranovensis =

Scientific classification
- Domain: Bacteria
- Kingdom: Pseudomonadati
- Phylum: Pseudomonadota
- Class: Gammaproteobacteria
- Order: Pseudomonadales
- Family: Pseudomonadaceae
- Genus: Pseudomonas
- Species: P. vranovensis

Binomial name
- Pseudomonas vranovensis Tvrzová, et al. 2006

Type strain
- DSM 16006 CCM 7279

Species of bacterium

Pseudomonas vranovensis is a Gram-negative soil bacterium.
