= Pseudomonas jinjuensis =

Scientific classification
- Domain: Bacteria
- Kingdom: Pseudomonadati
- Phylum: Pseudomonadota
- Class: Gammaproteobacteria
- Order: Pseudomonadales
- Family: Pseudomonadaceae
- Genus: Pseudomonas
- Species: P. jinjuensis

Binomial name
- Pseudomonas jinjuensis Kwon, et al. 2003

Species of bacterium

Pseudomonas jinjuensis is a Gram-negative, non-spore-forming, motile, single polar flagellated, yellow-white, rod bacterium isolated from soil in the Jinju Region of Korea. The type strain is LMG 21317.
