= Pseudomonas clemancea =

Scientific classification
- Domain: Bacteria
- Kingdom: Pseudomonadati
- Phylum: Pseudomonadota
- Class: Gammaproteobacteria
- Order: Pseudomonadales
- Family: Pseudomonadaceae
- Genus: Pseudomonas
- Species: P. clemancea

Binomial name
- Pseudomonas clemancea

Species of bacterium

Pseudomonas clemancea is a species of Pseudomonas bacteria which was first discovered in the North of England. The specific epithet clemancea was given by microbiologist Pattanathu Rahman at Teesside University to bestow the CLEMANCE (Clean Environment Management Centre). This bacterium has DNA coding distinct from existing species and has unique properties developed in response to the contaminated soil from which it comes.

== Biosurfactant from Pseudomonas clemancea ==
Surfactants work by reducing surface tension between two liquids or a liquid and a solid. Biosurfactants, surface-active agents of biological origin, have environment-friendly properties; they are bio-degradable, non-toxic and can be made organically using local raw material and producers. Biosurfactants can be used in soaps, detergents, medical ointments, or as emulsifiers, i.e. within ice cream, facial cream, or sun lotion. P. clemancea produces rhamnolipids type of biosurfactants to detoxify oil and chemicals contaminants in the ground.
