= Pseudomonas amyloderamosa =

Scientific classification
- Domain: Bacteria
- Kingdom: Pseudomonadati
- Phylum: Pseudomonadota
- Class: Gammaproteobacteria
- Order: Pseudomonadales
- Family: Pseudomonadaceae
- Genus: Pseudomonas
- Species: P. amyloderamosa

Binomial name
- Pseudomonas amyloderamosa Yokobayashi et al. 1971

Species of bacterium

Pseudomonas amyloderamosa is a Gram-negative soil bacterium that produces isoamylase. Because this organism is patented, it is not officially recognized as a legitimate Pseudomonas species, and therefore has no type strain. It is available, however, through the American Type Culture Collection.
