= Pseudomonas grimontii =

Scientific classification
- Domain: Bacteria
- Kingdom: Pseudomonadati
- Phylum: Pseudomonadota
- Class: Gammaproteobacteria
- Order: Pseudomonadales
- Family: Pseudomonadaceae
- Genus: Pseudomonas
- Species: P. grimontii

Binomial name
- Pseudomonas grimontii Baïda, et al. 2002

Species of bacterium

Pseudomonas grimontii is a Gram-negative, rod-shaped, fluorescent, motile bacterium isolated from natural springs in France. The type strain is CIP 106645.
