= Pseudomonas brassicacearum =

Scientific classification
- Domain: Bacteria
- Kingdom: Pseudomonadati
- Phylum: Pseudomonadota
- Class: Gammaproteobacteria
- Order: Pseudomonadales
- Family: Pseudomonadaceae
- Genus: Pseudomonas
- Species: P. brassicacearum

Binomial name
- Pseudomonas brassicacearum Achouak, et al. 2000

Type strain
- CFBP 5593 CIP 107059; DSM 13227; JCM 11938

Species of bacterium

Pseudomonas brassicacearum is a Gram-negative soil bacterium that infects the roots of Brassica napus, from which it derives its name. Based on 16S rRNA analysis, P. brassicacearum falls within the P. fluorescens group. It has also been shown to have both pathogenic and plant growth-promoting effects on tomato plants.
