= Pseudomonas extremorientalis =

Scientific classification
- Domain: Bacteria
- Kingdom: Pseudomonadati
- Phylum: Pseudomonadota
- Class: Gammaproteobacteria
- Order: Pseudomonadales
- Family: Pseudomonadaceae
- Genus: Pseudomonas
- Species: P. extremorientalis

Binomial name
- Pseudomonas extremorientalis Ivanova, et al. 2002

Species of bacterium

Pseudomonas extremorientalis is a Gram-negative, saprotrophic, fluorescent bacterium found in a drinking water reservoir near Vladivostok City, Russia. The type strain is LMG 19695.
