= Pseudomonas abietaniphila =

Scientific classification
- Domain: Bacteria
- Kingdom: Pseudomonadati
- Phylum: Pseudomonadota
- Class: Gammaproteobacteria
- Order: Pseudomonadales
- Family: Pseudomonadaceae
- Genus: Pseudomonas
- Species: P. abietaniphila

Binomial name
- Pseudomonas abietaniphila Mohn, et al. 1999

Type strain
- ATCC 700689 CCUG 50779; CIP 106708

Species of bacterium

Pseudomonas abietaniphila is a Gram-negative soil bacterium that grows on pulp mill effluents with resin acids. It is able to thrive in such environments by using tricyclic diterpenoids as a carbon source. It was first isolated in Canada.
