= Pseudomonas argentinensis =

Scientific classification
- Domain: Bacteria
- Kingdom: Pseudomonadati
- Phylum: Pseudomonadota
- Class: Gammaproteobacteria
- Order: Pseudomonadales
- Family: Pseudomonadaceae
- Genus: Pseudomonas
- Species: P. argentinensis

Binomial name
- Pseudomonas argentinensis Peix, et al. 2005

Type strain
- CECT 7010 CIP 108775; LMG 22563

Species of bacterium

Pseudomonas argentinensis is a yellow-pigmented, Gram-negative, rod-shaped, non-spore-forming, strictly aerobic organism bacterium that infects the rhizospheres of Chloris ciliata and Pappophorum caespitosum, both grasses native to the Chaco region (Cordoba) of Argentina.
