= Pseudomonas leptonychotis =

Scientific classification
- Domain: Bacteria
- Kingdom: Pseudomonadati
- Phylum: Pseudomonadota
- Class: Gammaproteobacteria
- Order: Pseudomonadales
- Family: Pseudomonadaceae
- Genus: Pseudomonas
- Species: P. leptonychotis

Binomial name
- Pseudomonas leptonychotis Nováková et al. 2020

Type strain
- P5773

Species of bacterium

Pseudomonas leptonychotis is a Gram-negative bacterium from the genus of Pseudomonas which has been isolated from a Weddell seal from the James Ross Island.
