= Pseudomonas frederiksbergensis =

Scientific classification
- Domain: Bacteria
- Kingdom: Pseudomonadati
- Phylum: Pseudomonadota
- Class: Gammaproteobacteria
- Order: Pseudomonadales
- Family: Pseudomonadaceae
- Genus: Pseudomonas
- Species: P. frederiksbergensis

Binomial name
- Pseudomonas frederiksbergensis Andersen, et al. 2000

Species of bacterium

Pseudomonas frederiksbergensis is a Gram-negative, phenanthrene-degrading bacterium from a coal gasification site in Frederiksberg, Copenhagen, Denmark. It is able to catalyse the asymmetric oxidation of sulfides to give exclusively the R enantiomer. The type strain is DSM 13022.
