= Pseudomonas xanthomarina =

Scientific classification
- Domain: Bacteria
- Kingdom: Pseudomonadati
- Phylum: Pseudomonadota
- Class: Gammaproteobacteria
- Order: Pseudomonadales
- Family: Pseudomonadaceae
- Genus: Pseudomonas
- Species: P. xanthomarina

Binomial name
- Pseudomonas xanthomarina Romanenko, et al. 2005

Type strain
- CCUG 46543 JCM 12468; KMM 1447; NRIC 0617

Species of bacterium

Pseudomonas xanthomarina is a bacterium found in marine ascidians. Unlike many other members of the genus Pseudomonas, it is not fluorescent.
