= Pseudomonas graminis =

Scientific classification
- Domain: Bacteria
- Kingdom: Pseudomonadati
- Phylum: Pseudomonadota
- Class: Gammaproteobacteria
- Order: Pseudomonadales
- Family: Pseudomonadaceae
- Genus: Pseudomonas
- Species: P. graminis

Binomial name
- Pseudomonas graminis Behrendt et al. 1999

Species of Bacteria

Pseudomonas graminis is a species of bacteria.
