= Pseudomonas balearica =

Scientific classification
- Domain: Bacteria
- Kingdom: Pseudomonadati
- Phylum: Pseudomonadota
- Class: Gammaproteobacteria
- Order: Pseudomonadales
- Family: Pseudomonadaceae
- Genus: Pseudomonas
- Species: P. balearica

Binomial name
- Pseudomonas balearica Bennasar, et al., 1996

Type strain
- CCUG 44487 CIP 105297; DSM 6083

Species of bacterium

Pseudomonas balearica is a Gram-negative, rod-shaped, nonfluorescent, motile, and denitrifying bacterium. It is an environmental bacterium that has been mostly isolated from polluted environments all over the world. Many of the isolates have demonstrated capabilities to degrade several compounds. Some of the strains are naphthalene degraders and one strain isolated in New Zealand has demonstrated the potential to oxidize inorganic sulfur compounds to tetrathionate. Based on 16S rRNA analysis, P. balearica has been placed in the P. stutzeri group.

The complete genome sequence of P. balearica type strain DSM 6083^{T} (= CCUG 44595^{T} = SP1402^{T}) is publicly available in DNA Data Bank of Japan, European Nucleotide Archive, and GenBank under the accession number CP007511. The draft genome sequences of P. balearica LS401 (CCUG 66666) and P. balearica st101 (CCUG 66667) are also available under the accession numbers LONE00000000 and LONF00000000, respectively. The genomes of the species have a size that vary between 4.2 and 4.4 Mb and have a GC-content that ranges from 64.6 to 65.1%.
