= Pseudomonas tuticorinensis =

Scientific classification
- Domain: Bacteria
- Kingdom: Pseudomonadati
- Phylum: Pseudomonadota
- Class: Gammaproteobacteria
- Order: Pseudomonadales
- Family: Pseudomonadaceae
- Genus: Pseudomonas
- Species: P. tuticorinensis

Binomial name
- Pseudomonas tuticorinensis Sreenivasan 1956

Species of bacterium

Pseudomonas tuticorinensis is a Gram-negative, marine denitrifying bacterium. The type strain is ATCC 12230.
