= Pseudomonas synxantha =

Scientific classification
- Domain: Bacteria
- Kingdom: Pseudomonadati
- Phylum: Pseudomonadota
- Class: Gammaproteobacteria
- Order: Pseudomonadales
- Family: Pseudomonadaceae
- Genus: Pseudomonas
- Species: P. synxantha

Binomial name
- Pseudomonas synxantha (Ehrenberg 1840); Holland 1920

Type strain
- ATCC 9890 CFBP 5591; CIP 59.22; JCM 11599; LMG 2190; NBRC 3913; NCTC 10696; NRRL B-780

Synonyms
- Vibrio synxanthus Ehrenberg 1840

Species of bacterium

Pseudomonas synxantha is a fluorescent rhizosphere bacterium with nematicidal properties. Based on 16S rRNA analysis, P. synxantha has been placed in the P. fluorescens group.
