= Pseudomonas vanderleydeniana =

Scientific classification
- Domain: Bacteria
- Kingdom: Pseudomonadati
- Phylum: Pseudomonadota
- Class: Gammaproteobacteria
- Order: Pseudomonadales
- Family: Pseudomonadaceae
- Genus: Pseudomonas
- Species: P. vanderleydeniana

Binomial name
- Pseudomonas vanderleydeniana Girard et al. 2022

Type strain
- RW8P3

Species of bacterium

Pseudomonas vanderleydeniana is a bacterium from the genus of Pseudomonas.
