= Pseudomonas simiae =

Scientific classification
- Domain: Bacteria
- Kingdom: Pseudomonadati
- Phylum: Pseudomonadota
- Class: Gammaproteobacteria
- Order: Pseudomonadales
- Family: Pseudomonadaceae
- Genus: Pseudomonas
- Species: P. simiae

Binomial name
- Pseudomonas simiae Vela, et al. 2006

Species of bacterium

Pseudomonas simiae is a Gram-negative, catalase- and oxidase-positive, rod-shaped bacterium isolated from monkeys (Callithrix geoffroyi). The type strain is CCUG 50988.
