= Pseudomonas rubescens =

Scientific classification
- Domain: Bacteria
- Kingdom: Pseudomonadati
- Phylum: Pseudomonadota
- Class: Gammaproteobacteria
- Order: Pseudomonadales
- Family: Pseudomonadaceae
- Genus: Pseudomonas
- Species: P. rubescens

Binomial name
- Pseudomonas rubescens Pivnick 1955

Species of bacterium

Pseudomonas rubescens is a Gram-negative soil bacterium that was originally isolated from the oil in a machine shop. The type strain is ATCC 12099.
