= Pseudomonas rhizosphaerae =

Scientific classification
- Domain: Bacteria
- Kingdom: Pseudomonadati
- Phylum: Pseudomonadota
- Class: Gammaproteobacteria
- Order: Pseudomonadales
- Family: Pseudomonadaceae
- Genus: Pseudomonas
- Species: P. rhizosphaerae

Binomial name
- Pseudomonas rhizosphaerae Peix, et al. 2003

Species of bacterium

Pseudomonas rhizosphaerae is a Gram-negative, strictly aerobic, non-spore-forming, motile, rod-shaped bacterium found in rhizospheric soil of grasses in Spain. The type strain is LMG 21640.
