= Pseudomonas oryzihabitans =

Scientific classification
- Domain: Bacteria
- Kingdom: Pseudomonadati
- Phylum: Pseudomonadota
- Class: Gammaproteobacteria
- Order: Pseudomonadales
- Family: Pseudomonadaceae
- Genus: Pseudomonas
- Species: P. oryzihabitans

Binomial name
- Pseudomonas oryzihabitans Kodoma, et al., 1985

Type strain
- ATCC 43272 CCUG 12540; CIP 102996; DSM 6835; IAM 1568; JCM 2952; LMG 7040

Synonyms
- Flavimonas oryzihabitans (Kodama et al. 1985) Holmes et al. 1987; Pseudomonas psychrotolerans Hauser et al. 2004

Species of bacterium

Pseudomonas oryzihabitans is a non-fermenting, yellow-pigmented, gram-negative, rod-shaped bacterium. Commonly found in soil and rice paddies, it is a known opportunistic pathogen in both warm-blooded animals and humans, leading to sepsis, peritonitis, endophthalmitis, and bacteremia understood to be of environmental origin. Infections mostly occur in individuals who are immune-compromised, suffering major illness, undergoing surgery, or those with catheters.

P. oryzihabitans can be distinguished from other non-fermenting bacterial species due to its aerobic behaviour, and by negative oxidase reaction.

Based on 16S RNA analysis, P. oryzihabitans has been placed in the Pseudomonas putida group.

== History ==
A member of the genus Pseudomonas, P. oryzihabitans was first described in 1894, first identified from urine and gastrointestinal samples in 1928 by E.G. Dresel and O Stickl, and originally named Chromobacterium typhiflavuum due to close resemblance to a similar bacteria causing enteric fever. The name, "Pseudomonas oryzihabitans" was first used in 1985 after Kentaro Kodama and his team isolated the species from soil samples taken from a rice field to find it had substantial phenotypic similarity to other Pseudomonads.

P. oryzihabitans has since been isolated in samples taken from hospital environments, common human infection sites - such as open wounds, eyes, skin and ears - and from damp environments. Currently, little is known about its pathogenesis so the likelihood of more virulent strains have not yet been described or identified.

== Pathogenesis ==
Although an uncommon pathogen, P. oryzihabitans is known to cause infections in individuals with compromised immune systems. Of the strains currently identified, it is not recognised as a primary infective agent, since infections are typically acquired by patients with an underlying disease who are subsequently hospitalized, have recently undergone surgery, and in those with diseases such as AIDS, leukemia, other autoimmune conditions or have weakened immune response.

Several studies focusing on pathogenic cases of P. oryzihabitans have identified a relationship between infection, underlying disease, and the use of catheters, suggesting infections are more likely to occur in those receiving hospital treatment for a debilitating disease which requires surgery or insertion of foreign materials in some part of the body.

P. oryzihabitans is most commonly found at infection sites related to respiratory equipment or devices used to deliver continuous ambulatory dialysis, where the bacteria spreads through contaminated fluids and insterile medical tools. As such, surgical hygiene practices must be maintained to prevent both external and internal spread of the bacteria to prevent the possibility of infection.

Nosocomial infections are usually acquired in hospital settings and within the first 48 hours of a patient's admission, while community-acquired infections are associated with exposure to the bacteria prior to admission where the infection then develops during the first two days in hospital.

Most cases of P. oryzihabitans infection lead to bacteraemia in critically ill patients, or peritonitis in individuals undergoing ambulatory peritoneal dialysis over a long period. Several reports of infections have been identified in AIDS patients, increasing the body of evidence for opportunistic infections due to the bacteria taking advantage of a weakened immune system. Although rare, cases of infection with P. oryzihabitans escalating to sepsis have been reported, however limited data exists as to the causative factors contributing to such cases.

Although these bacteria are able to cause infections, its role as a pathogen is questionable since this does not happen very often.

== Diagnosis/symptoms ==
Symptoms of P. oryzihabitans infection are often vague or resemble signs which indicate another illness or disease, making identification difficult based on symptoms alone. However, in several cases, these infections result after an individual's immune system has been weakened, so it is likely to occur in recovering or ill patients. Most patients, after receiving treatment for another disease or during recovery from surgery, experience chills and increase in body temperature. While these symptoms could mean a variety of things, it is clear that the patient's recovery is halted and that there is an infection of some sort. In an example where a woman developed an infection of P. oryzihabitans from a case of sinusitis, she experienced the same chills and elevated temperature, but also nasal discharge containing pus, right facial pain, and a fever.

To establish that these patients are infected with Pseudomonas oryzihabitans, blood samples are collected for tests and sent for cultures to be identified. Since the presence of these bacteria may not initially be known by any symptoms, having it identified in a lab will help with treating it. In certain situations, its role as a pathogen is also identified through evidence of pulmonary signs and symptoms, radiograph findings, and positive blood cultures.

== Treatment ==
In the past reported cases of P. oryzihabitans, the patients were given antibiotics to treat the infection. These bacteria are fairly easy to treat, with a range of antibiotics that they are susceptible to. The antibiotics that the infectious disease responded to are gentamicin, ciprofloxacin, carbapenems, cephalosprins, aminoglycosides, and quinolones. While there are several kinds of medicines that can treat P. oryzihabitans, the carbapenem displayed the best results against infections. In a study where cultures of these bacteria were grown, tests showed that all the isolates were susceptible to carbapenem antibiotics, however, the vulnerability to other medicines differed among the groups. Past studies also revealed that P. oryzihabitans were susceptible in vitro to antipseudomonal penicillins. Treatments for the bacteria differ and depend on the host and the different strains of P. oryzihabitans.

=== Resistance ===
The types of antibiotics that P. oryzihabitans are resistant to ampicillin, amoxicillin-clavulanic acid, and cefazolin. Since these bacteria are not as harmful or virulent to the host, antibiotics should clear up the infection, although in some cases, since they can be found around the sites of prosthetic material, catheter removal is required.

=== Prevention ===
In order to prevent an infection from these bacteria, good hygiene is required, especially when foreign materials or objects like catheters are in the body. However, even this cannot completely prevent P. oryzihabitans because of environmental contamination that could lead to acquirement of this organism.

In cases of patients with indwelling catheters, special care should be taken so that a community-acquired infection does not occur. It is recommended that these people should avoid the use of bath sponges and wet items for skin care, as these can be sites of growth and contamination of the bacteria.

== Ecology ==
By studying the environments in which P. oryzihabitans are found, scientists are able to get a clearer picture on how infections occur and how these bacteria may be found on individuals outside hospitals. Although the bacteria can be nosocomially acquired, the environment must be taken into account as a host for them. These bacteria, while observed in hospital sites, can originally be found in damp environments such as locations with water, stagnant or running, and soil. Data indicates that environmental sources could be a reason for the development of an infectious disease, as well as the presence of foreign objects in the body.

These bacteria were first studied in depth and identified after they were isolated from a rice paddy.

In one study, researchers found that P. oryzihabitans contaminated drinking water supply and questioned whether or not these bacteria are commonly found in naturally distributed water. The water supply systems were in contact with an object that is directly connected to sinkholes, which are known sites for the bacteria to linger. Since sinkholes are large underground cavities, they have enough room to foster water, making this environment an ideal place for P. oryzihabitans to grow.

These bacteria are able to persist in biofilms where they are relatively protected from chlorine disinfection. Their presence in drinking water is attributable to this fact.

When an infection caused by P. oryzihabitans was reported in a patient with AIDS and an indwelling catheter, scientists took samples from the man's home to see where these bacteria were located and to find out a possible explanation for his infection. The patient claimed that he followed the strict hygienic guidelines pertaining to catheters, so an environmental factor is responsible for the infection. They ended up tracing the origin of the bacteria to a bath sponge. In order for researchers to validate these findings, they also tested bath sponges from other households and found P. oryzihabitans in some separate samples as well. This suggests that the water could be contaminated with these bacteria, which in turn, could lead to potential infections in certain individuals.

== Clinical significance ==
Infections from P. oryzihabitans are increasingly associated with catheter-related bacteremia, peritonitis, wound infections, and meningitis (after surgery), mostly in patients with diseases that significantly weaken the individual.

Foreign material present in the body predisposes patients to infections, as well as those with severely weakened immune systems.

Most cases are nosocomially acquired, however, there are infections detected upon admission to a hospital. There are also cases where P. oryzihabitans was a causation of sepsis in some people. The only other oxidase negative Pseudomonas is P. luteola.

== Physiology ==
The cells of Pseudomonas oryzihabitans are rods with rounded ends. These Gram-negative bacteria are able to move due to a flagellum, and the cells occur singularly and very rarely in pairs. Strains of these bacteria produce a yellow water-insoluble pigment in their cells.

Their metabolism is restricted to an aerobic respiratory system. They are oxidative but not fermentative, and when isolated and cultured, their growth occurs on MacConkey agar and SS agar.
