= Pseudomonas lini =

Scientific classification
- Domain: Bacteria
- Kingdom: Pseudomonadati
- Phylum: Pseudomonadota
- Class: Gammaproteobacteria
- Order: Pseudomonadales
- Family: Pseudomonadaceae
- Genus: Pseudomonas
- Species: P. lini

Binomial name
- Pseudomonas lini Delorme, et al., 2002

Species of bacterium

Pseudomonas lini is a fluorescent, Gram-negative, rod-shaped bacterium isolated from rhizospheric soil in France. The type strain is CFBP 5737, though there are also eight other strains known. This bacterium has also been isolated from endophytic tissues of lodgepole pine trees growing on gravel mining sites with potential to perform biological nitrogen fixation and plant growth promotion.
