= Pseudomonas multiresinovorans =

Scientific classification
- Domain: Bacteria
- Kingdom: Pseudomonadati
- Phylum: Pseudomonadota
- Class: Gammaproteobacteria
- Order: Pseudomonadales
- Family: Pseudomonadaceae
- Genus: Pseudomonas
- Species: P. multiresinovorans

Binomial name
- Pseudomonas multiresinovorans Hernandez et al. 2008

Species of bacterium

"Pseudomonas multiresinovorans" is a species of pseudomonad bacteria.
