= Pseudomonas migulae =

Scientific classification
- Domain: Bacteria
- Kingdom: Pseudomonadati
- Phylum: Pseudomonadota
- Class: Gammaproteobacteria
- Order: Pseudomonadales
- Family: Pseudomonadaceae
- Genus: Pseudomonas
- Species: P. migulae

Binomial name
- Pseudomonas migulae Verhille, et al., 1999

Type strain
- CCUG 43165 CIP 105470; CFML 95-321; JCM 21628

Species of bacterium

Pseudomonas migulae is a fluorescent, Gram-negative, rod-shaped bacterium isolated from natural mineral waters in France. This bacterium has also been isolated from endophytic tissues of lodgepole pine trees growing on gravel mining sites with potential to perform biological nitrogen fixation and plant growth promotion. Based on 16S rRNA analysis, P. migulae has been placed in the P. fluorescens group.
