= Stutzerimonas chloritidismutans =

Scientific classification
- Domain: Bacteria
- Kingdom: Pseudomonadati
- Phylum: Pseudomonadota
- Class: Gammaproteobacteria
- Order: Pseudomonadales
- Family: Pseudomonadaceae
- Genus: Stutzerimonas
- Species: S. chloritidismutans

Binomial name
- Stutzerimonas chloritidismutans (Wolterink et al. 2002) Lalucat et al. 2022

Synonyms
- Pseudomonas chloritidismutans Wolterink et al. 2002; Pseudomonas kunmingensis Xie et al. 2014; Stutzerimonas kunmingensis (Xie et al. 2014) Lalucat et al. 2022

Species of bacterium

Stutzerimonas chloritidismutans is a Gram-negative, rod-shaped, facultatively anaerobic bacterium in the family Pseudomonadaceae. It performs dissimilatory chlorate reduction but does not carry out denitrification.

The type strain, AW-1, was isolated from biomass in an anaerobic chlorate-reducing bioreactor.

== Taxonomy ==
The species was originally classified as Pseudomonas chloritidismutans. It was transferred to the genus Stutzerimonas when the Pseudomonas stutzeri group was separated from Pseudomonas.

Genome-based analysis supported the distinction between S. chloritidismutans and S. stutzeri. The same analysis found that Stutzerimonas kunmingensis belongs to the same genomic species and treated it as a later heterotypic synonym of S. chloritidismutans.
