= Pseudomonas otitidis =

Scientific classification
- Domain: Bacteria
- Kingdom: Pseudomonadati
- Phylum: Pseudomonadota
- Class: Gammaproteobacteria
- Order: Pseudomonadales
- Family: Pseudomonadaceae
- Genus: Pseudomonas
- Species: P. otitidis

Binomial name
- Pseudomonas otitidis Clark, et al. 2006

Species of bacterium

Pseudomonas otitidis is a Gram-negative bacterium that causes otitis. The type strain is ATCC BAA-1130.
