= Pseudomonas costantinii =

Scientific classification
- Domain: Bacteria
- Kingdom: Pseudomonadati
- Phylum: Pseudomonadota
- Class: Gammaproteobacteria
- Order: Pseudomonadales
- Family: Pseudomonadaceae
- Genus: Pseudomonas
- Species: P. costantinii

Binomial name
- Pseudomonas costantinii Munsch, et al. 2002

Species of bacterium

Pseudomonas costantinii is a Gram-negative bacterium that causes brown blotch disease in cultivated mushrooms. It demonstrates hemolytic activity. The type strain is CFBP 5705.
