= Pseudomonas pohangensis =

Scientific classification
- Domain: Bacteria
- Kingdom: Pseudomonadati
- Phylum: Pseudomonadota
- Class: Gammaproteobacteria
- Order: Pseudomonadales
- Family: Pseudomonadaceae
- Genus: Pseudomonas
- Species: P. pohangensis

Binomial name
- Pseudomonas pohangensis Weon, et al., 2006

Species of bacterium

Pseudomonas pohangensis is a Gram-negative, non-fluorescent, non-sporulating, non-motile, rod-shaped bacterium isolated from seashore sand on Homi cape, near Pohang city, Korea. The type strain is KACC 11517.
