= Pseudomonas azotifigens =

Scientific classification
- Domain: Bacteria
- Kingdom: Pseudomonadati
- Phylum: Pseudomonadota
- Class: Gammaproteobacteria
- Order: Pseudomonadales
- Family: Pseudomonadaceae
- Genus: Pseudomonas
- Species: P. azotifigens

Binomial name
- Pseudomonas azotifigens //corrig.// Hatayama, et al. 2005

Type strain
- ATCC BAA-1049 JCM 12708

Synonyms
- Pseudomonas azotofixans Hatayama, et al. 2005

Species of bacterium

Pseudomonas azotifigens is a Gram-negative, nitrogen-fixing bacterium isolated from a compost pile in Japan.
