= Pseudomonas palleroniana =

Scientific classification
- Domain: Bacteria
- Kingdom: Pseudomonadati
- Phylum: Pseudomonadota
- Class: Gammaproteobacteria
- Order: Pseudomonadales
- Family: Pseudomonadaceae
- Genus: Pseudomonas
- Species: P. palleroniana

Binomial name
- Pseudomonas palleroniana Gardan, et al. 2002

Synonyms
- Pseudomonas palleronii

Species of bacterium

Pseudomonas palleroniana is a Gram-negative bacterium that infects rice (Oryza sativa). The type strain is CFBP 4389.
