= Pseudomonas indica =

Scientific classification
- Domain: Bacteria
- Kingdom: Pseudomonadati
- Phylum: Pseudomonadota
- Class: Gammaproteobacteria
- Order: Pseudomonadales
- Family: Pseudomonadaceae
- Genus: Pseudomonas
- Species: P. indica

Binomial name
- Pseudomonas indica Pandey, et al. 2002

Species of bacterium

Pseudomonas indica is a Gram-negative, butane-using bacterium first isolated in India. The type strain is MTCC 3713.
