= Pseudomonas turbinellae =

Scientific classification
- Domain: Bacteria
- Kingdom: Pseudomonadati
- Phylum: Pseudomonadota
- Class: Gammaproteobacteria
- Order: Pseudomonadales
- Family: Pseudomonadaceae
- Genus: Pseudomonas
- Species: P. turbinellae

Binomial name
- Pseudomonas turbinellae Sreenivasan 1956

Species of bacterium

Pseudomonas turbinellae is a Gram-negative bacterium that causes bacterial leaf spot. It was first isolated on Cleome monophylla. The type strain is ATCC 12446.
