= Pseudomonas bathycetes =

Scientific classification
- Domain: Bacteria
- Kingdom: Pseudomonadati
- Phylum: Pseudomonadota
- Class: Gammaproteobacteria
- Order: Pseudomonadales
- Family: Pseudomonadaceae
- Genus: Pseudomonas
- Species: P. bathycetes

Binomial name
- Pseudomonas bathycetes Quigley and Colwell 1968

Type strain
- 1.716 93 °C; ATCC 23597; C2M2 p Tm

Species of bacterium

"Pseudomonas bathycetes" is a species of pseudomonad bacteria.
