= Pseudomonas septica =

Scientific classification
- Domain: Bacteria
- Kingdom: Pseudomonadati
- Phylum: Pseudomonadota
- Class: Gammaproteobacteria
- Order: Pseudomonadales
- Family: Pseudomonadaceae
- Genus: Pseudomonas
- Species: P. septica

Binomial name
- Pseudomonas septica Bergey, et al. 1930

Species of bacterium

Pseudomonas septica is a Gram-negative, rod-shaped, non-spore-forming, bacterium that is pathogenic to insects. It was first isolated on the weevil Xyloterus lineatus. The type strain is ATCC 14545.
