= Pseudomonas alcaliphila =

Scientific classification
- Domain: Bacteria
- Kingdom: Pseudomonadati
- Phylum: Pseudomonadota
- Class: Gammaproteobacteria
- Order: Pseudomonadales
- Family: Pseudomonadaceae
- Genus: Pseudomonas
- Species: P. alcaliphila

Binomial name
- Pseudomonas alcaliphila Yumoto, et al. 2001

Type strain
- IAM 14884 JCM 10630

Species of bacterium

Pseudomonas alcaliphila is a psychrophilic, alkaliphilic, Gram-negative, aerobic straight rod bacterium with polar flagella isolated from sea water near Hokkaidō, Japan.
