= Pseudomonas lutea =

Scientific classification
- Domain: Bacteria
- Kingdom: Pseudomonadati
- Phylum: Pseudomonadota
- Class: Gammaproteobacteria
- Order: Pseudomonadales
- Family: Pseudomonadaceae
- Genus: Pseudomonas
- Species: P. lutea

Binomial name
- Pseudomonas lutea Peix, et al. 2004

Species of bacterium

Pseudomonas lutea is a Gram-negative, strictly aerobic, non-spore-forming, motile, rod-shaped bacterium originally isolated from the rhizosphere of grasses in Spain. The type strain is LMG 21974.
