= Pseudomonas plecoglossicida =

Scientific classification
- Domain: Bacteria
- Kingdom: Pseudomonadati
- Phylum: Pseudomonadota
- Class: Gammaproteobacteria
- Order: Pseudomonadales
- Family: Pseudomonadaceae
- Genus: Pseudomonas
- Species: P. plecoglossicida

Binomial name
- Pseudomonas plecoglossicida Nishimori, et al., 2000

Strains
- ATCC 700383; CCUG 49623; CIP 106493; DSM 15088; JCM 21584

Species of bacterium

Pseudomonas plecoglossicida is a fluorescent, Gram-negative, rod-shaped, motile bacterium that causes hemorrhagic ascites in the ayu fish (Plecoglossus altivelis), from which it derives its name. Based on 16S rRNA analysis, P. plecoglossicida has been placed in the P. putida group.
