= Pseudomonas virus 42 =

Virus classification
- (unranked): Virus
- (unranked): incertae sedis
- Species: Pseudomonas virus 42

Synonyms
- Pseudomonas phage 42

Species of virus

Pseudomonas virus 42, formerly Pseudomonas phage 42, is a bacteriophage known to infect Pseudomonas bacteria.
