= Pseudomonas corrugata =

Scientific classification
- Domain: Bacteria
- Kingdom: Pseudomonadati
- Phylum: Pseudomonadota
- Class: Gammaproteobacteria
- Order: Pseudomonadales
- Family: Pseudomonadaceae
- Genus: Pseudomonas
- Species: P. corrugata

Binomial name
- Pseudomonas corrugata Roberts and Scarlett 1978

Type strain
- ATCC 29736 CCUG 23367 and 32778; CFBP 2431; CIP 105514; DSM 7228; ICMP 5819; LMG 2172; NCPPB 2445

Species of bacterium

Pseudomonas corrugata is a Gram-negative, plant-pathogenic bacterium that causes pith necrosis in tomatoes. Based on 16S rRNA analysis, P. corrugata has been placed in the P. fluorescens group. For a more comprehensive phylogenetic analysis of P. corrugata and its closely related phytopathogenic bacterium P. mediterranea, refer to Trantas et al. 2015.
