= Pseudomonas trivialis =

Scientific classification
- Domain: Bacteria
- Kingdom: Pseudomonadati
- Phylum: Pseudomonadota
- Class: Gammaproteobacteria
- Order: Pseudomonadales
- Family: Pseudomonadaceae
- Genus: Pseudomonas
- Species: P. trivialis

Binomial name
- Pseudomonas trivialis Behrendt, et al. 2003

Species of bacterium

Pseudomonas trivialis is a fluorescent, Gram-negative bacterium isolated from the phyllosphere of grasses. The type strain is DSM 14937.
