= Pseudomonas meliae =

Scientific classification
- Domain: Bacteria
- Kingdom: Pseudomonadati
- Phylum: Pseudomonadota
- Class: Gammaproteobacteria
- Order: Pseudomonadales
- Family: Pseudomonadaceae
- Genus: Pseudomonas
- Species: P. meliae

Binomial name
- Pseudomonas meliae Ogimi 1981

Type strain
- ATCC 33050 CFBP 3225; ICMP 6289; LMG 2220; NCPPB 3033

Species of bacterium

Pseudomonas meliae is a fluorescent, Gram-negative, soil bacterium that causes bacterial gall of the chinaberry (Melia azedarach), from which it derives its name. Based on 16S rRNA analysis, P. meliae has been placed in the Pseudomonas syringae group. Genotypic characteristics of the causal agent of chinaberry gall were determined by Aeini and Taghavi.
