= Atopomonas =

Scientific classification
- Domain: Bacteria
- Kingdom: Pseudomonadati
- Phylum: Pseudomonadota
- Class: Gammaproteobacteria
- Order: Pseudomonadales
- Family: Pseudomonadaceae
- Genus: Atopomonas; Rudra and Gupta 2021
- Species: A. hussainii

Binomial name
- Atopomonas hussainii (Hameed et al. 2014) Rudra and Gupta 2021

Type strain
- BCRC 80696 CC-AMH-11; JCM 19513

Synonyms
- Atopomonas: Parapseudomonas Saati-Santamaría et al. 2021; Atopomonas hussainii: Parapseudomonas hussainii (Hameed et al. 2014) Saati-Santamaría et al. 2021; Pseudomonas hussainii Hameed et al. 2014

Species of bacteria

Atopomonas hussainii is a species of pseudomonad bacteria. Cells of Atopomonas hussainii are gram-negative.
