= Pseudomonas anguilliseptica =

Scientific classification
- Domain: Bacteria
- Kingdom: Pseudomonadati
- Phylum: Pseudomonadota
- Class: Gammaproteobacteria
- Order: Pseudomonadales
- Family: Pseudomonadaceae
- Genus: Pseudomonas
- Species: P. anguilliseptica

Binomial name
- Pseudomonas anguilliseptica Wakabayashi and Egusa 1972

Strains
- ATCC 33660; CCUG 35503; CIP 106711; DSM 12111; NCIMB 1949

Species of bacterium

Pseudomonas anguilliseptica is species of Gram-negative bacterium. It was first isolated from Japanese eels (Anguilla japonica). Based on 16S rRNA analysis, P. anguilliseptica has been placed in the P. aeruginosa group.

This species is a notable pathogen of several fish species, including turbot (Scophthalmus maximus) and seabream (Sparus aurata). The average mortality rate is 10-15%, although it has reached as high as 30% in some farms.
