= Pseudomonas luteola =

Scientific classification
- Domain: Bacteria
- Kingdom: Pseudomonadati
- Phylum: Pseudomonadota
- Class: Gammaproteobacteria
- Order: Pseudomonadales
- Family: Pseudomonadaceae
- Genus: Pseudomonas
- Species: P. luteola

Binomial name
- Pseudomonas luteola Kodoma, et al., 1985

Type strain
- ATCC 43273 CCUG 37974; CFBP 3007; CIP 102995; DSM 6975; IAM 13000; JCM 3352; LMG 7041

Synonyms
- Chryseomonas luteola (Kodama et al. 1985) Holmes et al. 1987; Chryseomonas polytrichaHolmes et al. 1986

Species of bacterium

Pseudomonas luteola is an opportunistic pathogen, found ubiquitously in damp environments. Originally designated in the genus Chryseomonas, the species has since been reassigned to the genus Pseudomonas.

== Morphology ==
Pseudomonas luteola is a Gram-negative, motile aerobe. Its motility is created by multitrichous flagella. They grow as rods of 0.8 μm to 2.5 μm. Colonies produce a yellow-orange pigment. Optimal temperature for growth is 30 °C. Importantly for classification, it grows best on heart infusion agar supplemented with 5% horse blood. It is also able to grow on TSA, Nutrient Agar, Mac Conkey or CASA Agar.

== Biosorption ==
Pseudomonas luteola can absorb certain heavy metals such as Cr(VI) and Al(III). Both ions are found in industrial wastewaters. These metals are specifically targeted by P. luteola strain TEM05. Under relatively acidic conditions (pH: 4 and 5 for each ion respectively). Experiments indicated a maximum adsorption capacity of 55.2 mg g^{−1} for Al(III) and 3.0 mg g^{−1} for Cr(VI).

This same strain is also known to produce an exopolysaccharide (EPS) utilized in the adsorption of nickel and copper. In order to adsorb Ni and Cu at significant levels, the strain must be immobilized in a calcium alginate beads. With this enhancement, maximum adsorption capacities range from 45.87 to 50.81 mg g^{−1} and 52.91–61.73 mg g^{−1}, respectively.

== Pathenogenicity ==
The pathogenic form of Pseudomonas luteola is a saprophyte. It is an opportunistic pathogen that can cause bacteremia, meningitis, prosthetic valve endocarditis, peritonitis in humans and animals. P. luteola is registered by the CDC as group Ve-1. Most strains are susceptible to broad-spectrum antibiotics, such as cephalosporins, aminosids, and ciprofloxacin. However, infections associated with foreign material are highly resistant, and infected prostheses have to be removed if possible.
