= Pseudomonas virus phiCTX =

Virus classification
- (unranked): Virus
- Realm: Duplodnaviria
- Kingdom: Heunggongvirae
- Phylum: Uroviricota
- Class: Caudoviricetes
- Family: Peduoviridae
- Genus: Citexvirus
- Species: Pseudomonas virus phiCTX

Species of virus

Pseudomonas virus phiCTX is a virus of the family Peduoviridae, genus Citexvirus.

As a member of the group I of the Baltimore classification, Pseudomonas virus phiCTX is a dsDNA virus. All peduoviruses share a nonenveloped morphology consisting of a head and a tail separated by a neck. Its genome is linear. The propagation of the virions includes the attaching to a host cell (a bacterium, as Pseudomonas virus phiCTX is a bacteriophage) and the injection of the double stranded DNA; the host transcribes and translates it to manufacture new particles. To replicate its genetic content requires host cell DNA polymerases and, hence, the process is highly dependent on the cell cycle.

Its genome contains 35,538 base pairs with 5'-extruding cohesive ends encoding 47 open reading frames.
