= Phikmvvirus =

Virus classification
- (unranked): Virus
- Realm: Duplodnaviria
- Kingdom: Heunggongvirae
- Phylum: Uroviricota
- Class: Caudoviricetes
- Order: Autographivirales
- Subfamily: Krylovirinae
- Genus: Phikmvvirus

Genus of viruses

Phikmvvirus is a genus of viruses that infect bacteria. There are currently 16 species in this genus including the type species Pseudomonas virus phiKMV. Bacteriophage phiKMV and its relatives are known to be highly virulent phages, producing large (3–15 mm (0.12–0.59 in) diameter) clear plaques on a susceptible host. The only reported exception is phage LKA1, which yields small plaques (1 mm (0.039 in)) surrounded by a halo. While all other P. aeruginosa-specific phikmvviruses use the Type IV pili as primary receptor, LKA1 particles attach to the bacterial lipopolysaccharide layer.

== Taxonomy ==
The following species are recognized:

- Pseudomonas virus 130-113
- Pseudomonas virus 15pyo
- Pseudomonas virus Ab05
- Pseudomonas virus ABTNL
- Pseudomonas virus DL62
- Pseudomonas virus kF77
- Pseudomonas virus LKD16
- Pseudomonas virus LUZ19
- Pseudomonas virus MPK6
- Pseudomonas virus MPK7
- Pseudomonas virus NFS
- Pseudomonas virus PAXYB1
- Pseudomonas virus phiKMV
- Pseudomonas virus PT2
- Pseudomonas virus PT5
- Pseudomonas virus RLP

== Virology ==
Electron microscopic imaging of purified phage particles revealed these phages as typical members of the Podoviridae, with a head diameter of approximately 60 nm (2.4×10^{−6} in) and a stubby tail with a length of 8–10 nm. Although phiKMV phage resembles the well-studied podovirus T7 in overall genome architecture, it was the first known T7-like phage which encoded a single-subunit RNA polymerase gene downstream its DNA metabolism genes instead of in the early genomic region. Based on these properties, the genus Phikmvvirus is classified within the Autographiviridae.

Genus	Structure	Symmetry	Capsid	Genomic arrangement	Genomic segmentation
Phikmvvirus	Head-Tail	T=7	Non-enveloped	Linear	Monopartite

== Life cycle ==
Viral replication is cytoplasmic. Entry into the host cell is achieved by absorption into the host cell. DNA-templated transcription is the method of transcription. The virus exits the host cell by lysis, and holin/endolysin/spanin proteins. Bacteria serve as the natural host. Transmission routes are passive diffusion.

Genus	Host details	Tissue tropism	Entry details	Release details	Replication site	Assembly site	Transmission
Phikmvvirus	Bacteria	None	Injection	Lysis	Cytoplasm	Cytoplasm	Passive diffusion
