= Pseudomonas protegens =

Scientific classification
- Domain: Bacteria
- Kingdom: Pseudomonadati
- Phylum: Pseudomonadota
- Class: Gammaproteobacteria
- Order: Pseudomonadales
- Family: Pseudomonadaceae
- Genus: Pseudomonas
- Species: P. protegens

Binomial name
- Pseudomonas protegens Ramette et al. 2011

Type strain
- DSM 19095 ATCC BAA-477

Synonyms
- Pseudomonas fluorescens Flügge 1886

Species of bacterium

Pseudomonas protegens are widespread Gram-negative, plant-protecting bacteria. Some of the strains of this novel bacterial species (CHA0 and Pf-5, for example) previously belonged to P. fluorescens. They were reclassified since they seem to cluster separately from other fluorescent Pseudomonas species. P. protegens is phylogenetically related to the Pseudomonas species complexes P. fluorescens, P. chlororaphis, and P. syringae. The bacterial species characteristically produces the antimicrobial compounds pyoluteorin and 2,4-diacetylphloroglucinol (DAPG) which are active against various plant pathogens.

== General characteristics ==
Like P. fluorescens, Pseudomonas protegens is a typical soil microorganism with an extremely versatile metabolism, and can be isolated from roots of various plant species. The microbe is strictly aerobe (no reduction of nitrate) and oxidase-positive. The bacterium grows at temperatures between 4 °C and 36 °C, and has one to three flagella.

=== The name ===
The word Pseudomonas means 'false unit', being derived from the Greek words pseudo (Greek: ψευδο 'false') and monas (Latin: monas, fr. Greek: μονάς/μονάδα 'a single unit'). The species name 'protegens' refers to the bacterium's ability to protect plants from soil-borne phytopathogens.

=== Genome sequencing projects ===
The genome of P. protegens strain Pf-5 has been sequenced and published.

== Biocontrol properties ==
Pseudomonas protegens has been studied for more than twenty years for its biocontrol properties. Most studies have been carried out with the model strains CHA0 and Pf-5.

=== Insecticidal activity ===
In addition to efficiently protect plant roots against phytopathogenic fungi (described in detail for P. fluorescens), Pseudomonas protegens was discovered to display toxicity towards certain insects upon oral ingestion or injection into the hemolymph. The insecticidal activity of the bacterium was found to be in part due to the production of an insect toxin (FitD), which is similar to a well-known protein toxin (Mcf) produced by Photorhabdus luminescens.
