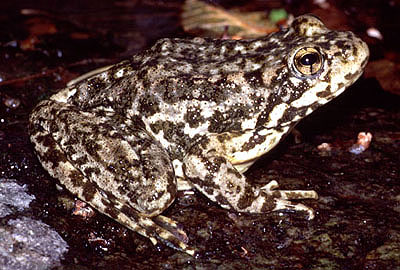

Conservation status
- Endangered (IUCN 3.1)

Scientific classification
- Kingdom: Animalia
- Phylum: Chordata
- Class: Amphibia
- Order: Anura
- Family: Ranidae
- Genus: Rana
- Species: R. muscosa

Binomial name
- Rana muscosa Camp, 1917
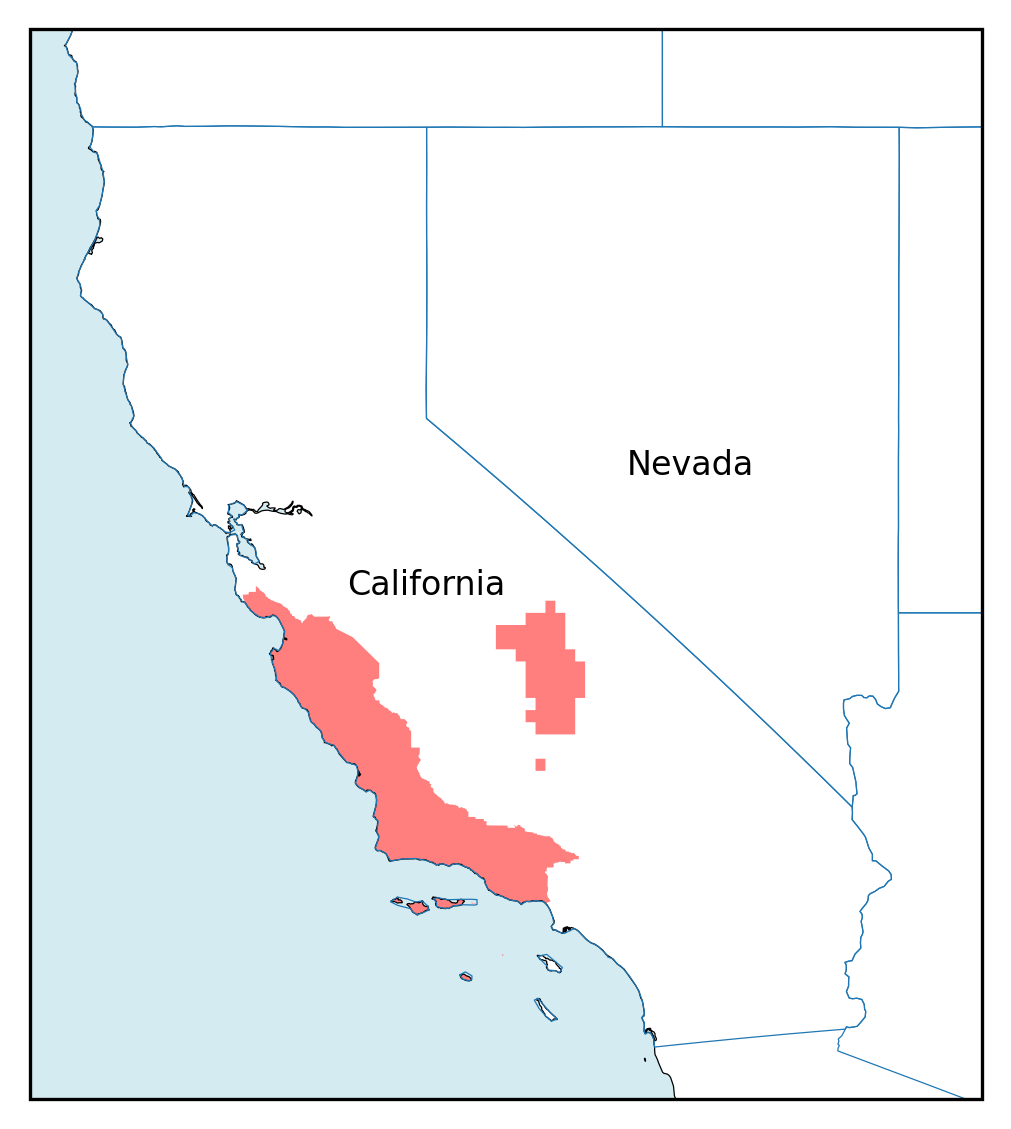

Synonyms
- Rana boylii muscosa Camp, 1917; Rana muscosa — Zweifel, 1955; Amerana muscosa — Fei, Ye, and Jiang, 2010

= Mountain yellow-legged frog =

Species of amphibian

The southern mountain yellow-legged frog (Rana muscosa), formerly known as the mountain yellow-legged frog, is a species of true frog endemic to California in the United States. It occurs in the San Jacinto Mountains, San Bernardino Mountains, and San Gabriel Mountains in Southern California and the Southern Sierra Nevada. It is a federally listed endangered species, separated into two distinct population segments (DPS): a northern DPS, listed endangered in 2014, and a southern DPS that was listed endangered in 2002.

Populations formerly classified as Rana muscosa in the northern Sierra Nevada have since been redescribed as a new species: Rana sierrae, the Sierra Nevada yellow-legged frog. The Sierra Nevada yellow-legged frog has also been classified as a federally endangered species since 2014. The mountains separating the headwaters of the South Fork and Middle Fork of the Kings River mark the boundary between the ranges of the two species.

== Description ==
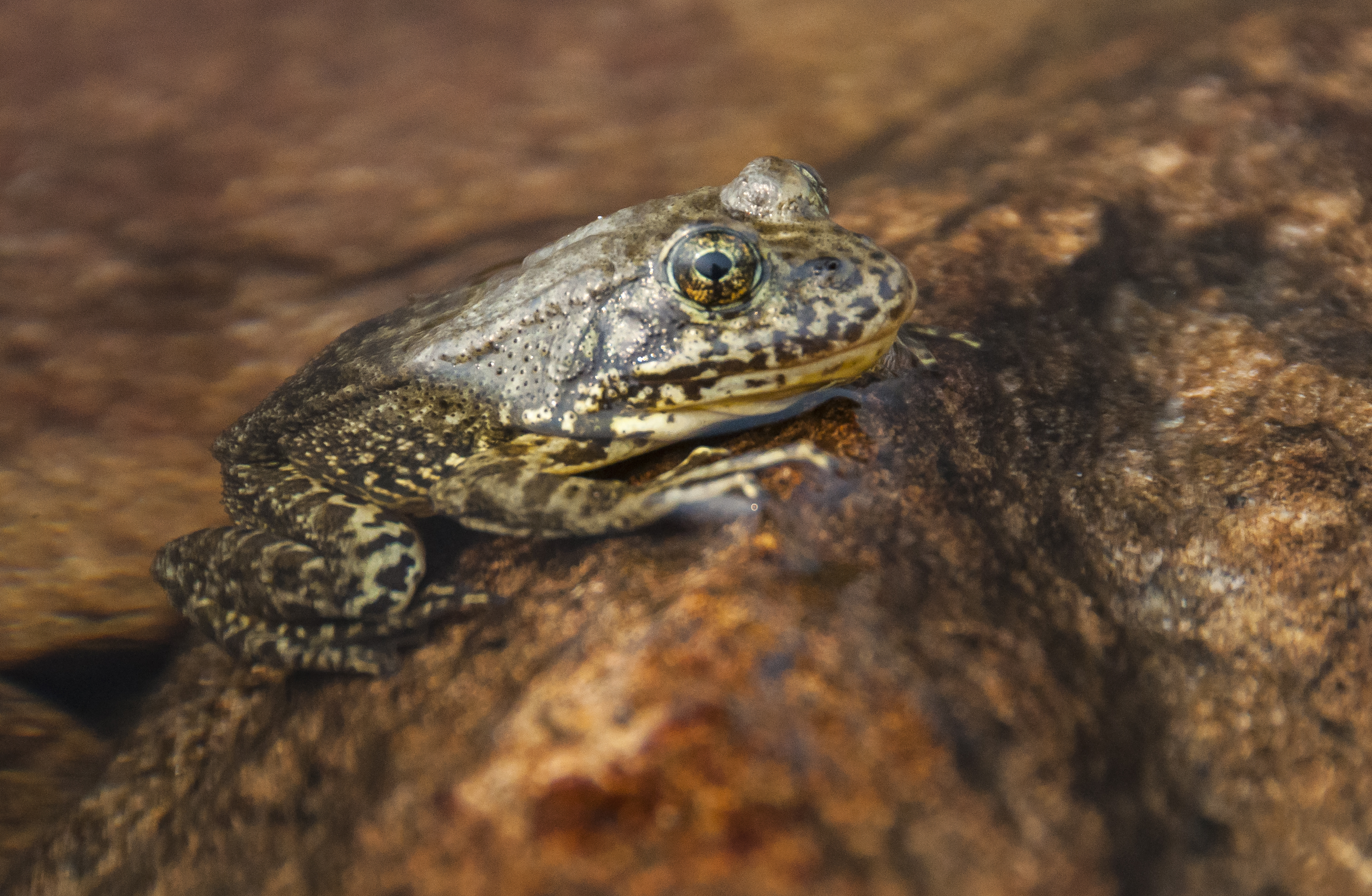
Mountain yellow-legged frog

Rana muscosa is 4 to 8.9 centimetres (1.6 to 3.5 in) long. Females tend to be larger than males. Its color and patterning are variable. It is yellowish, brownish, or olive with black and brown markings. The underside of its hind legs can be different hues of yellow, from a bold sun yellow to a lighter pale yellow; larger ones may have hints of orange on their hind legs. The throats of it range from white to yellow. Along with its variable coloration, the frog also has a dorsal pattern with dark spots in different shapes and sizes. Its species name muscosa is from the Latin meaning "mossy" or "full of moss", inspired by its coloration. It may have light orange or yellow thighs. When handled, the frog emits a defensive odor reminiscent of garlic.

== Habitat ==
The frog occurs in mountain creeks, lakes and lakeshores, streams, and pools, preferring sunny areas. It rarely strays far from water, and can remain underwater for a very long time, likely through cutaneous gas exchange. As such, adults can be found on rocks around shorelines. Close proximity to water is important because eggs are either laid underwater attached to rocks or in shallow waters. The tadpoles require a permanent water habitat for at least two years while they develop. This is because tadpoles can die from a lack of moisture, especially dry summers. The frog has been noted at elevations of between about 1,214 and 7,546 feet (370 and 2,300 m) in Southern California. These habitats are primarily found in north of California in Sierra Nevada and south of California in the Transverse ranges.

== Reproduction and early life ==
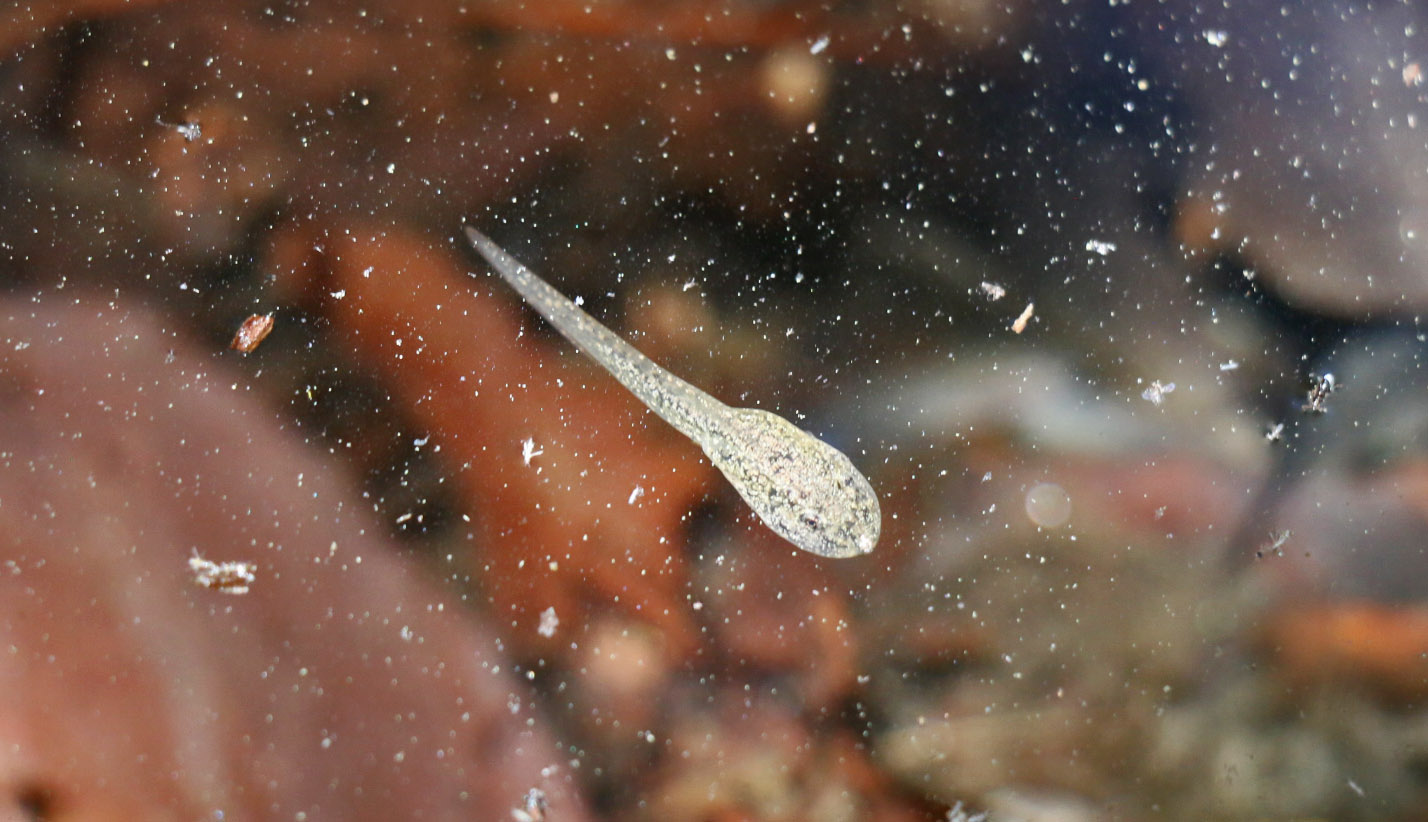
Tadpole stage

The frog emerges from its wintering site soon after snowmelt. Its breeding season begins once the highest meltwater flow is over, around March through May in the southern part of its range, and up to July in higher mountains to the north. Fertilization is external, and the egg cluster is secured to vegetation in a current, or in still waters sometimes left floating free. The frog may not reach mature breeding age for 1-4 years because the maturation rate depends deeply on climate. For example, the tadpole stage may last for 3-4 years before undergoing metamorphosis in very cold conditions. Extremely cold temperatures also result in larvae death. The tadpole stage is split into 2: First year and second year tadpoles with metamorphosis usually occurring second summer in normal conditions. During this stage, they are called metamorphs (tadpole to young frog) and then called Juvenile after surviving one winter. The frog then reaches mature, reproductive age after 2 years in the juvenile stage.

== Behavior ==
The frog lacks a vocal sac. Its call is raspy, rising at the end. During the day, it calls underwater. The frogs tend to be less active during the winters and more active during the mating season. For years when there is heavy snow at high elevations, they may only be active for 90 days in the summer. Hibernation tends to happen underwater or in the crevices of stream banks. This occurs during the cold months of winter. Hibernation ends in the spring to start the breeding season. This species feeds on aquatic insects and benthic invertebrates. Their diet varies depending on the habitat type. When living in streams, it tends to eat terrestrial insects such as beetles, ants, bees, wasps, flies, and dragonflies. They are also known to eat larvae of other frogs and toads, as well as commit cannibalism.

== Decline ==
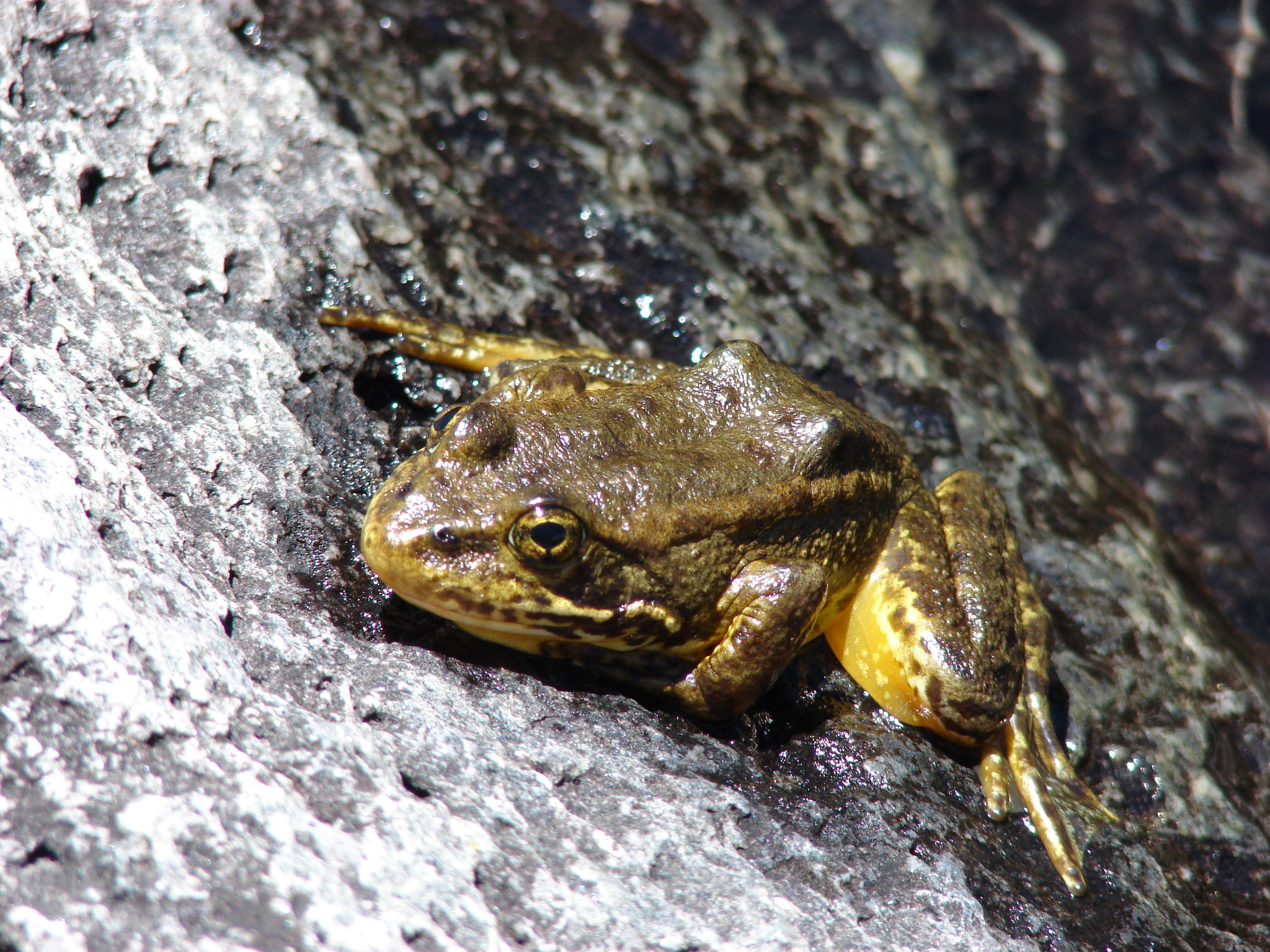

Once a common species, Rana muscosa was absent from much of its native range by the 1970s. Over the course of the last hundred years, 90% of its populations have been eliminated. The frog was known from 166 locations in the Southern California mountains, and as of 2007, only seven or eight remained. The 2009 discovery of R. muscosa at two locations in the San Bernardino National Forest was newsworthy. The frog is represented in the Sierra Nevada by three or four populations. Its decline is attributed to many factors, including introduced species of fish such as trout, livestock grazing, chytrid fungus, and probably pesticides, drought, and ultraviolet radiation. Recreational activities in streams have also had an impact.

=== Introduced fish species ===
Trout were introduced to lakes and streams throughout the Sierra Nevada in the late 1800s to increase recreational fishing in the area. 90% of these Sierra Nevada lakes and streams did not previously have fish in them, although the trout were regionally present. The fish feed on tadpoles. Some of the fish types that prey on tadpoles include the brown, golden, and rainbow trout, as well as the brook trout. The introduced trout have changed the distribution of several native species in the local ecosystems. Most of the mountain yellow-legged frog populations did not evolve to adapt to the trout. The trout caused populations to isolate, restricted the amount of available habitats, and increased the chances of extinction. According to the Mountain Yellow-legged Frog Conservation strategy published by The U.S. Fish and Wildlife Service trout removal has been an important addition to restore fish populations. There are several methods to achieve this removal including gill nets, electrofishing, pesticides (chemicals). After the removal of fish from several lakes, the frog reappeared and its populations increased. These frogs then began to disperse to other suitable habitats nearby.

=== Pesticides ===
The decline of the frog from its historic range has been associated with pesticide drift from agricultural areas. Frogs that have been reintroduced to water bodies cleared of fish have failed to survive, and analysis has isolated pesticides in their tissues. Pesticides are considered by some authorities to be a greater threat to the frog than the trout. The relative roles that pesticides and introduced fish play in frog declines are still debated, and the loss of R. muscosa in its former range has probably been influenced by multiple factors.

=== Chytridiomycosis ===
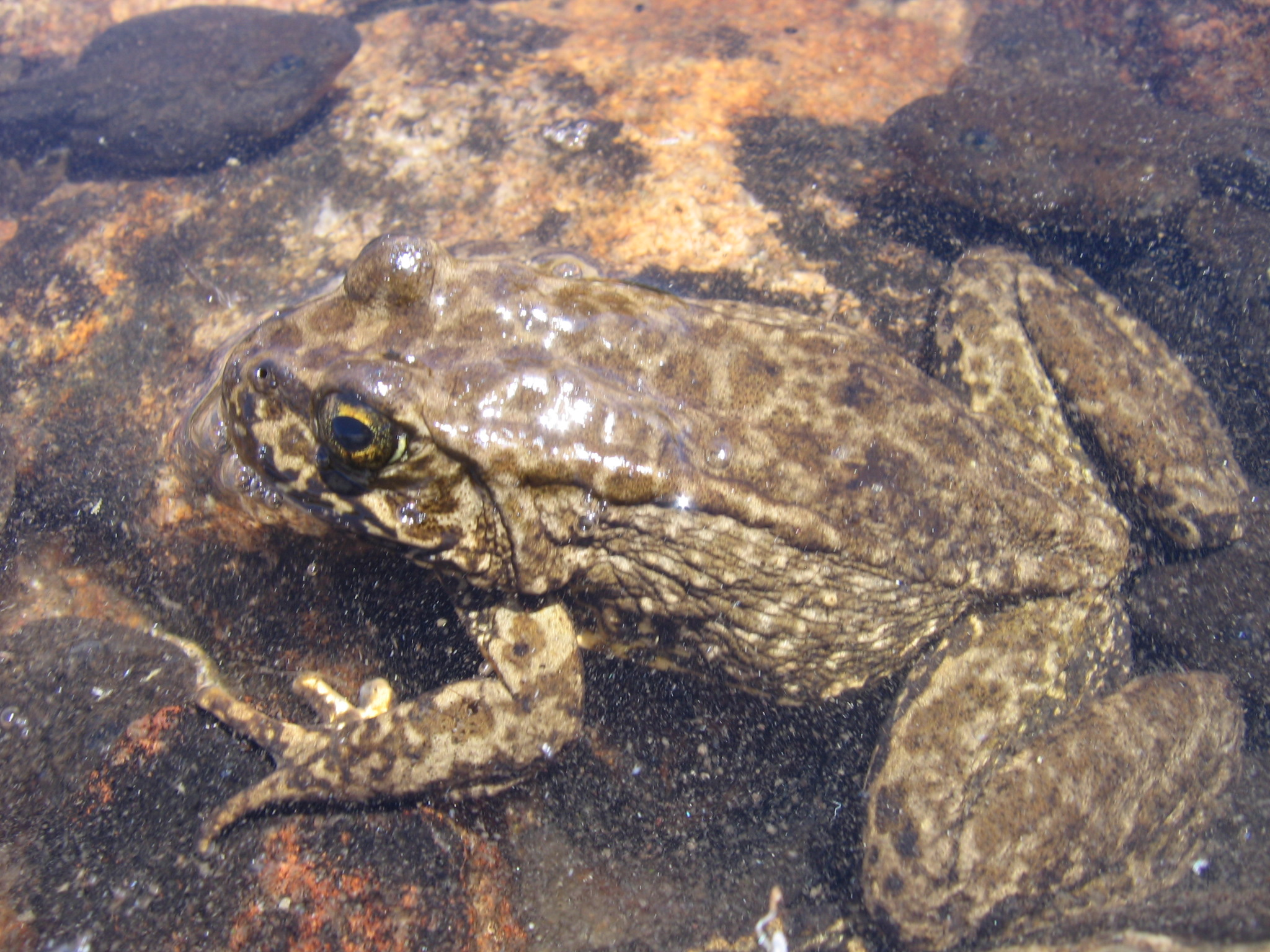
Rana muscosa

This species is one of many amphibians affected by the fungal disease chytridiomycosis. Ample research has explored the biology of the fungus and how to prevent related amphibian declines. The fungus attacks keratinized areas of a frog's body. Tadpoles are not severely affected because only their jaw sheaths and tooth rows are heavily keratinized. Infection in a tadpole can be identified by changes in the pigmentation of these parts. Adults have keratin-rich skin and suffer worse infections.

In studies, healthy adult frogs exposed to infected frogs for at least two weeks developed the disease. Transmission takes longer in tadpoles, generally over seven weeks. Frogs may be predisposed to infection if their immune systems are weakened by other factors, such as pesticide. Studies indicate that R. muscosa is naturally more susceptible to the chytrid fungus than many other frogs.

However, a recent study found that some populations of mountain yellow-legged frogs are resistant to chytrid fungus. In August 2005, researchers swabbed the skin of two groups of frogs from lakes in California that were experiencing outbreaks of chytridiomycosis. The microbes from the swabs were cultured and exposed to chytrid fungus. The researchers saw that the microbes from the frogs’ skin had anti-fungal properties and inhibited the growth of chytrid fungus.

In another study, one of the anti-fungal microbes was identified as Janthinobacterium lividum. To test its effectiveness against chytrid fungus, three groups of frogs were treated with solutions containing either chytrid fungus, J. lividum, or both the fungus and anti-fungal microbe. The frogs treated with J. lividum survived exposure to the fungus. Researchers found that the microbe makes a secondary metabolite called violacein that is the source of its anti-fungal properties.

== Conservation status and efforts ==
The frog is an endangered species under the US Endangered Species Act. It is separated into two distinct population segments (DPS): a northern DPS, listed endangered since 2014, and a southern DPS that was listed endangered in 2002. The two DPS are separated by the Tehachapi Mountains, and occupy unique habitats: the northern DPS lives in lakes or slow-moving water bodies at alpine and subalpine elevations in the Sierra Nevada, while the southern DPS lives in faster flowing and warmer waters of the chaparral, although it may also occur at higher elevations in the Transverse Range. In addition, the DPS show genetic divergence, likely reflecting ancient reproductive isolation.

The International Union for Conservation of Nature has also listed the mountain yellow-legged frog as endangered. Its NatureServe conservation status is "critically imperiled".

The first successful captive breeding of the frog occurred in 2009 when three tadpoles were reared at the San Diego Zoo. Conservation workers at the zoo plan to release any more surviving captive-bred frogs in the San Jacinto Mountains, part of their native range.

Captive breeding needed because of a very large, 98% decline, in mountain yellow-legged frog species with the populations found in less than 10 locations. They are classified as endangered and thus conservation breeding is an important way to help the species grow. This conservation breeding occurs at the San Diego Zoo wildlife alliance.

In 2015 frogs and tadpoles of the species were reintroduced to Fuller Mill Creek in the San Bernardino Mountains and San Bernardino National Forest. They were bred and raised the Arnold and Mabel Beckman Center for Conservation Research in Escondido, one of the organizations that have partnered with the San Diego Zoo Institute for Conservation Research (ICR) to save the species from extinction. The Los Angeles Zoo is also a coalition partner and is raising two groups of wild collected tadpoles from two localities in the San Gabriel Mountains where they are released when ready.

In 2015, the Oakland Zoo began a rehabilitation project of the frog in order to fuel efforts to save the species. Every year, a group of tadpoles are taken from native lakes throughout California and brought to the zoo. There, the tadpoles are grown to juvenile frogs, while also undergoing an inoculation process to render them immune to the chytridiomycosis fungus disease. Once ready, the now chytrid immune juvenile frogs are released back into the lakes they were found. In 2016, the Oakland Zoo released 53 specimens into various lakes in Sequoia and Kings Canyon National Parks. The program is set to release 130 inoculated individuals into lakes in Sequoia and Kings Canyon National Parks and Inyo National Forest in 2017.

In 2021, the Aquarium of the Pacific partnered with government organizations like the California Department of Fish and Wildlife to create a facility for taking care of mountain yellow-legged frogs. This was in response to recent wildfires which harmed their habitats. Following the wildfires, wildlife agencies found and moved these frogs into places like the facility established by the Aquarium of the Pacific. These efforts help the species recover from natural disasters and prevent extinction.

In 2026, the San Diego Zoo Wildlife Alliance took initiative in Southern California, specifically the Big Bear area. The SDZWA contributed to the conservation effort by releasing 3000 southern mountain yellow-legged frogs (Rana muscosa). Although there is continued research on the most effective ways to increase the populations of southern mountain yellow-legged frogs, reintroduction through releasing tadpoles is a key way that conservationists are boosting the species. Researchers also note that reintroducing the species is vital because the threat of catastrophe for the species remains whether it is a flood, fire or drought.
