= Chytridiomycosis =

Amphibian disease

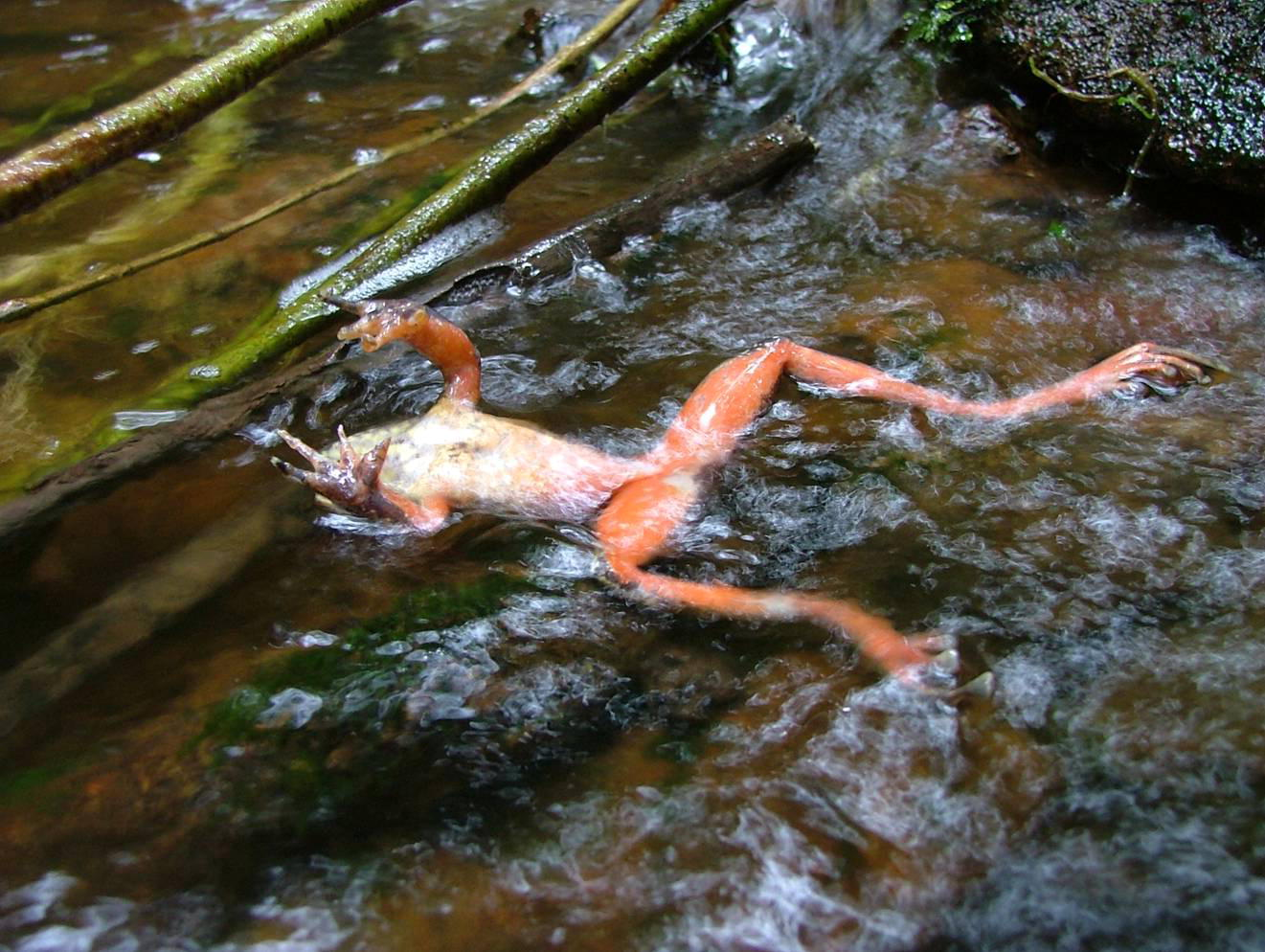
A chytrid-killed frog

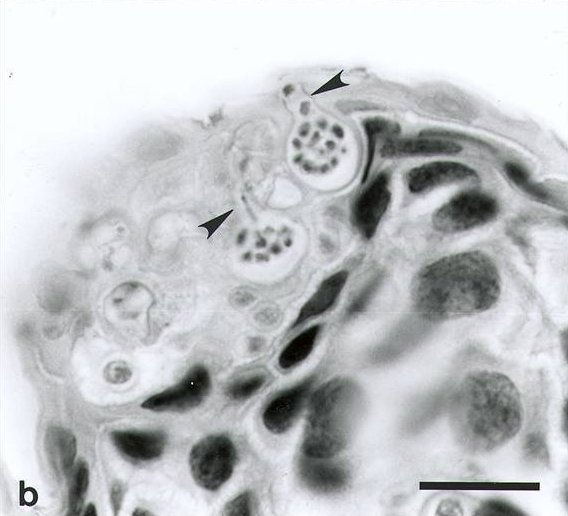
Chytridiomycosis in Atelopus varius—two sporangia containing numerous zoospores are visible.

Chytridiomycosis (/kaɪˌtrɪdiəmaɪˈkoʊsɪs/ ky-TRID-ee-ə-my-KOH-sis) is an infectious disease in amphibians, caused by the chytrid fungi Batrachochytrium dendrobatidis and Batrachochytrium salamandrivorans. Chytridiomycosis has been linked to dramatic population declines or extinctions of amphibian species in western North America, Central America, South America, eastern Australia, east Africa (Tanzania), and Dominica and Montserrat in the Caribbean. Much of the Old World is also at risk of the disease arriving within the coming years. The fungus is capable of causing sporadic deaths in some amphibian populations and 100% mortality in others. No effective measure is known for control of the disease in wild populations. Various clinical signs are seen by individuals affected by the disease. A number of options are possible for controlling this disease-causing fungus, though none has proved to be feasible on a large scale. The disease has been proposed as a contributing factor to a global decline in amphibian populations that apparently has affected about 30% of the amphibian species of the world. Some research found evidence insufficient for linking chytrid fungi and chytridiomycosis to global amphibian declines, but more recent research establishes a connection and attributes the spread of the disease to its transmission through international trade routes into native ecosystems.

== History ==
Whether chytridiomycosis is a new, emergent pathogen or an extant pathogen with recently increased virulence is unclear.

The disease in its epizootic form was first discovered in 1993 in dead and dying frogs in Queensland, Australia. It had been present in the country since at least 1978 and is widespread across Australia. It is also found in Africa, the Americas, Europe, New Zealand, and Oceania. In Australia, Panama, and New Zealand, the fungus seemed to have suddenly 'appeared' and expanded its range at the same time frog numbers declined. In the Americas, it originated in Venezuela in 1987, where it swept up the continent into Central America. It was also found in the lower part of Central America in 1987, where it spread down to meet the upward sweep from South America. However, it may simply be that the fungus occurs naturally and was only identified recently because it has become more virulent or more prevalent in the environment, or because host populations have become less resistant to the disease. The fungus has been detected in four areas of Australia—the east coast, Adelaide, south-west Western Australia and the Kimberley—and is probably present elsewhere. Lately, the genomes of 234 Batrachochytrium dendrobatidis isolates were phylogenetically compared and the results strongly suggest that a lineage found in the Korean peninsula likely seeded the panzootic.

Among frogs, the oldest documented occurrence of Batrachochytrium is from a specimen of a Titicaca water frog collected in 1863, and among salamanders the oldest was a Japanese giant salamander collected in 1902. However, both these involved strains of the fungus that have not been implicated in mass-mortality events. A later instance of a Bd-infected amphibian was a specimen of an African clawed frog (Xenopus laevis) collected in 1938, and this species also appears to be essentially unaffected by the disease, making it a suitable vector. The first well-documented method of human pregnancy testing, known as the frog test, involved this species, and as a result, large-scale international trade in living African clawed frogs began more than 60 years ago. If Batrachochytrium originated in Africa, the African clawed frog is thought to have been the vector of the initial spread out of the continent. The earliest documented case of the disease chytridiomycosis was an American bullfrog (Rana catesbeiana) collected in 1978.

== Range ==
The geographic range of chytridiomycosis is difficult to ascertain. If it occurs, the disease is only present where the fungus B. dendrobatidis is present. However, the disease is not always present where the fungus is. Reasons for amphibian declines are often termed 'enigmatic' because the cause is unknown. Why some areas are affected by the fungus while others are not is not fully understood. Oscillating factors such as climate, habitat suitability, and population density may be factors which cause the fungus to infect amphibians of a given area. Therefore, when considering the geographic range of chytridiomycosis, the range of B. dendrobatidis occurrence must be considered. The geographic range of B. dendrobatidis has recently been mapped, and spans much of the world. B. dendrobatidis has been detected in 56 of 82 countries, and in 516 of 1240 (42%) species using a data set of more than 36,000 individuals. It is widely distributed in the Americas, and detected sporadically in Africa, Asia, and Europe. Asia, for example, has only 2.35% prevalence.

The range suitable for B. dendrobatidis in the New World is vast. Regions with its highest suitability include habitats that contain the world's most diverse amphibian fauna. Areas at risk are the Sierra Madre Pine Oak Occidental Forest, the Sonoran and Sinaloan dry forest, the Veracruz moist forest, Central America east from the Isthmus of Tehuantepec, the Caribbean Islands, the temperate forest in Chile and western Argentina south of 30°S, the Andes above 1000 m above sea level in Venezuela, Colombia, and Ecuador, eastern slopes of the Andes in Peru and Bolivia, the Brazilian Atlantic forest, Uruguay, Paraguay, and northeastern Argentina, as well as the southwestern and Madeira–Tapajós Amazonian rainforests.

Currently, the effects of chytridiomycosis are seen most readily in Central America, eastern Australia, South America, and western North America.

== Climate change ==
A study suggests that changing global temperatures may be responsible for increased proliferation of chytridiomycosis. The rise in temperature has increased evaporation in certain forest environments that as a result has promoted cloud formation. Experts propose that increased cloud cover might actually be decreasing the daytime temperature by blocking the sun, while at night the cloud cover serves as insulation to raise the nighttime temperature from its normal range. The combination of decreased daytime temperature and increased nighttime temperatures may be providing optimal growth and reproduction for Chytrid fungus which has preferred temperature range between 17° and 25 °C (63° and 77 °F). The fungus dies at temperatures at and above 30 °C, which without the cloud cover from increased evaporation is more easily reached by the environment and can, therefore, more easily keep the fungus population in check.

== Causative agents ==
Chytridiomycosis caused by the fungus B. dendrobatidis predominantly affects the outermost layers of skin containing keratin. When most species reach a B. dendrobatidis threshold of 10,000 zoospores, they are not able to breathe, hydrate, osmoregulate, or thermoregulate correctly. This is proven by blood samples that show a lack of certain electrolytes, such as sodium, magnesium, and potassium. B. dendrobatidis is currently known to have two life stages. The first is the asexual zoosporangial stage. When a host first contracts the disease, spores penetrate the skin and attach themselves using microtubule roots. The second stage takes place when the initial asexual zoosporangia produce motile zoospores. To disperse and infect epidermal cells, a wet surface is needed. A second species of Batrachochytrium, B. salamandrivorans, was discovered in 2013 and is known to cause chytridiomycosis in salamanders.

== Disease transmission and progression ==
B. dendrobatidis, a waterborne pathogen, disperses zoospores into the environment. The zoospores use flagella for locomotion through water systems until they reach a new host and enter cutaneously. The B. dendrobatidis' lifecycle continues until new zoospores are produced from the zoosporangium and exit to the environment or reinfect the same host. Once the host is infected with B. dendrobatidis, it can potentially develop chytridiomycosis, but not all infected hosts develop it. Other forms of transmission are currently unknown; however, chytridiomycosis is postulated to be transmitted through direct contact of hosts or through an intermediate host.

Much of how B. dendrobatidis is successfully transmitted from one host to the next is largely unknown. Once released into the aquatic environment, zoospores travel less than 2 cm (0.8 in) within 24 hours before they encyst. The limited range of B. dendrobatidis zoospores suggest some unknown mechanism exists by which they transmit from one host to the next, which can involve the pet trade, and especially the American bullfrog. Abiotic factors such as temperature, pH level, and nutrient levels affect the success of B. dendrobatidis zoospores. The fungus zoospores can survive within a temperature range of 4–25 °C (39–77 °F) and a pH range of 6–7.

Chytridiomycosis is believed to follow this course: zoospores first encounter amphibian skin and quickly give rise to sporangia, which produce new zoospores. The disease then progresses as these new zoospores reinfect the host. Morphological changes in amphibians infected with the fungus include a reddening of the ventral skin, convulsions with extension of hind limbs, accumulations of sloughed skin over the body, sloughing of the superficial epidermis of the feet and other areas, slight roughening of the surface with minute skin tags, and occasional small ulcers or hemorrhage. Behavioral changes can include lethargy, a failure to seek shelter, a failure to flee, a loss of righting reflex, and abnormal posture (e.g., sitting with the hind legs away from the body).

Besides amphibians Chytridiomycosis also infects crayfish (Procambarus alleni, P. clarkii, Orconectes virilis, and O. immunis) but not mosquitofish (Gambusia holbrooki).

== Clinical signs ==
Amphibians infected with B. dendrobatidis have been known to show many different clinical signs. Perhaps the earliest sign of infection is anorexia, occurring as quickly as eight days after being exposed. Individuals infected are also commonly found in a lethargic state, characterized by slow movements, and refuse to move when stimulated. Excessive shedding of skin is seen in most frog species affected by B. dendrobatidis. These pieces of shed skin are described as opaque, gray-white, and tan. Some of these patches of skin are also found adhered to the skin of the amphibians. These signs of infection are often seen 12–15 days following exposure. The most typical symptom of chytridiomycosis is thickening of skin, which promptly leads to the death of the infected individuals because those individuals cannot take in the proper nutrients, release toxins, or, in some cases, breathe. Other common signs are reddening of the skin, convulsions, and a loss of righting reflex. A meta-analysis showed skin disruption, hormonal changes, and osmoregulation can occur with light infection, while higher pathogen loads are required to influence reproduction. In tadpoles, B. dendrobatidis affects the mouthparts, where keratin is present, leading to abnormal feeding behaviors or discoloration of the mouth.

== Research and impact ==
The amphibian chytrid fungus appears to grow best between 17 and 25 °C (63 and 77 °F), and exposure of infected frogs to high temperatures can cure the frogs. In nature, the more time individual frogs were found at temperatures above 25 °C, the less likely they were to be infected by the amphibian chytrid. This may explain why chytridiomycosis-induced amphibian declines have occurred primarily at higher elevations and during cooler months. Naturally produced cutaneous peptides can inhibit the growth of B. dendrobatidis when the infected amphibians are around temperatures near 10 °C (50 °F), allowing species like the northern leopard frog (Rana pipiens) to clear the infection in about 15% of cases.

Although many declines have been credited to the fungus B. dendrobatidis—although likely prematurely so in many cases—some species resist the infection and some populations can survive with a low level of persistence of the disease. In addition, some species that seem to resist the infection may actually harbor a nonpathogenic form of B. dendrobatidis.

Some researchers contend the focus on chytridiomycosis has made amphibian conservation efforts dangerously myopic. A review of the data in the IUCN Red List found the threat of the disease was assumed in most cases, but no evidence shows, in fact, it is a threat. Conservation efforts in New Zealand continue to be focused on curing the critically endangered native Archey's frog, Leiopelma archeyi, of chytridiomycosis, though research has shown clearly that they are immune from infection by B. dendrobatidis and are dying in the wild of other still-to-be identified diseases. In Guatemala, several thousand tadpoles perished from an unidentified pathogen distinct from B. dendrobatidis.

A 2019 Science review assessed that chytridiomycosis was a factor in the decline of at least 501 amphibian species during the past 50 years, of which 90 species were confirmed or presumed to have gone extinct in the wild and another 124 had declined in numbers by more than 90%. The review characterized the overall toll as the "greatest recorded loss of biodiversity attributable to a disease". However, a follow-up study in Science found the 2019 study by Scheele et al. to be lacking in the necessary evidence to make these claims and found the conclusions could not be reproduced with the original study's data and methods. It remains unclear how many and which species have been impacted by chytridiomycosis, but there are good data for a limited number of species such as the mountain yellow-legged frog in the Sierra Nevada mountains.

== Immunity ==
Due to the fungus' immense impact on amphibian populations, considerable research has been undertaken to devise methods to combat its proliferation in the wild. Among the most promising is the revelation that amphibians in colonies that survive the passage of the chytrid epidemic tend to carry higher levels of the bacterium Janthinobacterium lividum. This bacterium produces antifungal compounds, such as indole-3-carboxaldehyde and violacein, that inhibit the growth of B. dendrobatidis even at low concentrations. Similarly, the bacterium Lysobacter gummosus found on the red-backed salamander (Plethodon cinereus), produces the compound 2,4-diacetylphloroglucinol that is inhibitory to the growth of B. dendrobatidis. A 2021 research study found an even wider range of antifungal bacteria living on amphibians.

Understanding the interactions of microbial communities present on amphibians' skin with fungal species in the environment can reveal why certain amphibians, such as the frog Rana muscosa, are susceptible to the fatal effects of B. dendrobatidis and why others, such as the salamander Hemidactylium scutatum, are able to coexist with the fungus. As mentioned before, the antifungal bacterial species Janthinobacterium lividum, found on several amphibian species, has been shown to prevent the effects of the pathogen even when added to another amphibian that lacks the bacteria (B. dendrobatidis-susceptible amphibian species). Interactions between cutaneous microbiota and B. dendrobatidis can be altered to favor the resistance of the disease, as seen in past studies concerning the addition of the violacein-producing bacteria J. lividum to amphibians that lacked sufficient violacein, allowing them to inhibit infection. Although the exact concentration of violacein (antifungal metabolite produced by J. lividum) needed to inhibit the effects of B. dendrobatidis is not fully confirmed, violacein concentration can determine whether or not an amphibian will experience morbidity (or mortality) caused by B. dendrobatidis. The frog Rana muscosa, for example, has been found to have very low concentrations of violacein on its skin, yet the concentration is so small, it is unable to facilitate increased survivability of the frog; furthermore, J. lividum has not been found to be present on the skin of R. muscosa. This implies that the antifungal bacterium J. lividum (native to other amphibians' skin, such as Hemidactylium scutatum) is able to produce a sufficient amount of violacein to prevent infection by B. dendrobatidis and allow coexistence with the potentially deadly fungus.

One study has postulated that the water flea Daphnia magna eats the spores of the fungus.

== Interactions with pesticides ==
The hypothesis that pesticide use has contributed to declining amphibian populations has been suggested several times in the literature. Interactions between pesticides and chytridiomycosis were examined in 2007, and sublethal exposure to the pesticide carbaryl (a cholinesterase inhibitor) was shown to increase susceptibility of foothill yellow-legged frogs (Rana boylii) to chytridiomycosis. In particular, the skin peptide defenses were significantly reduced after exposure to carbaryl, suggesting pesticides may inhibit this innate immune defence, and increase susceptibility to disease.

== Evolution ==
Hints of emerging evolutionary resistance in a rebounding population of an afflicted frog species were reported from ecological study of an epizootically endangered stream-breeding frog Mixophyes fleayi reported from subtropical Australia. Rebound of frog species in Panama after decline are not associated with pathogen attenuation, but rather a host factor - whether an evolved genetic resistance to the fungus infection, or an otherwise acquired trait (such as a hypothetically protective microbial colonization) is yet to be identified.

== Treatment options ==
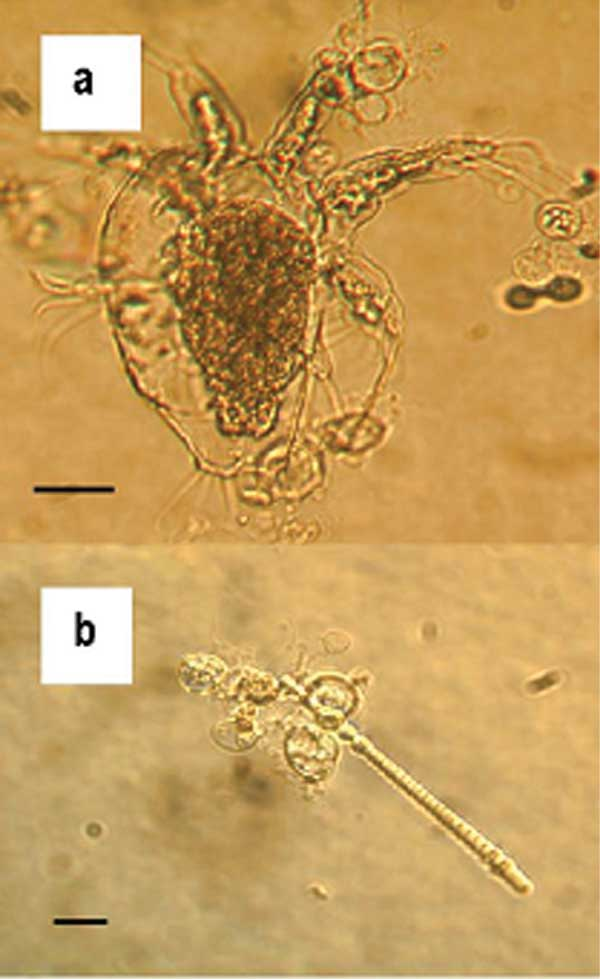
Zoosporangia of Batrachochytrium dendrobatidis strain 98-1810/3 visible as transparent spherical bodies growing in lake water on (a) freshwater arthropod and (b) algae

The use of antifungals and heat-induced therapy has been suggested as a treatment of B. dendrobatidis. However, some of these antifungals may cause adverse skin effects on certain species of frogs, and although they are used to treat species that are infected by chytridiomycosis, the infection is never fully eradicated. A study done by Rollins-Smith and colleagues suggests that itraconazole is the antifungal of choice when it comes to treatment of Bd. This is favored in comparison to amphotericin B and chloramphenicol because of their toxicity—specifically chloramphenicol, as it is correlated with leukemia in toads. This becomes a difficult situation because without treatment, frogs will suffer from limb deformities and even death, but may also suffer skin abnormalities with treatment. "Treatment is not always 100% successful and not all amphibians tolerate treatment very well, therefore chytridiomycosis should always be treated with the advice of a veterinarian."

Individuals infected with B. dendrobatidis are bathed in itraconazole solutions, and within a few weeks, previously infected individuals test negative for B. dendrobatidis using PCR assays. Heat therapy is also used to neutralize B. dendrobatidis in infected individuals. Temperature-controlled laboratory experiments are used to increase the temperature of an individual past the optimal temperature range of B. dendrobatidis. Experiments, where the temperature is increased beyond the upper bound of the B. dendrobatidis optimal range of 25 to 30 °C, show its presence will dissipate within a few weeks and infected individuals return to normal. Formalin/malachite green has also been used to successfully treat individuals infected with chytridiomycosis. An Archey's frog was successfully cured of chytridiomycosis by applying chloramphenicol topically. However, the potential risks of using antifungal drugs on individuals are high.

Bioaugmentation is also considered as a possible treatment against B. dendrobatidis. The amphibian host and even the environment can be augmented with probiotic bacteria that express anti-fungal metabolites that can fight B. dendrobatidis. An example of probiotic application is in the species Rana muscosa in Sierra Nevada; individuals treated with the probiotic J. lividum exhibited greater survival and lower B. dendrobatidis loads compared to untreated controls. Similar results were obtained for the Beyşehir frog, an endemic frog species in Turkey (Pelophylax caralitanus).

== See also ==
- Emerging infectious diseases
- Gastric-brooding frog
- Golden toad
- Guajira stubfoot toad
- Holocene extinction
- Rabb's Fringe-limbed Treefrog
- White nose syndrome
