= DAPG =

DAPG may refer to:

- 2,4-DAPG (2,4-diacetylphloroglucinol), a chemical compound
- Dolphin Action and Protection Group, a non-governmental organization in South Africa which campaigns for the protection and conservation of dolphins and whales
