= Amidinoaspartase =

Class of enzymes

Identifiers
- EC no.: 3.5.3.14
- CAS no.: 37325-60-3

Databases
- BRENDA: enzyme data
- ExPASy: NiceZyme view
- KEGG: enzyme entry
- MetaCyc: metabolic pathway
- Rhea: reactions
- PDB structures: RCSB PDB PDBe PDBsum
- Gene Ontology: AmiGO / QuickGO
Search
- PMC: articles
- PubMed: articles
- NCBI: proteins

Amidinoaspartase (EC 3.5.3.14) is an enzyme characterised from Pseudomonas chlororaphis that catalyzes the hydrolysis of N-amidino-L-aspartic acid to L-aspartic acid and urea:

N-amidino-L-aspartic acid
H_{2}O
aspartic acid
+
urea

This enzyme is a hydrolase, one acting on carbon-nitrogen bonds other than peptide bonds, specifically in linear amidines. The systematic name of this enzyme class is N-amidino-L-aspartate amidinohydrolase. This enzyme is also called amidinoaspartic amidinohydrolase.
