= P. aurantiaca =

P. aurantiaca may refer to:

- Pilosella aurantiaca, the fox-and-cubs, orange hawkweed, tawny Hawkweed, Devil's paintbrush or Grim-the-collier, a flowering plant species native to alpine regions of central and southern Europe
- Pseudomonas aurantiaca, a Gram-negative soil bacterium species

== See also ==
- Aurantiaca
