= Pseudomonas taetrolens =

Scientific classification
- Domain: Bacteria
- Kingdom: Pseudomonadati
- Phylum: Pseudomonadota
- Class: Gammaproteobacteria
- Order: Pseudomonadales
- Family: Pseudomonadaceae
- Genus: Pseudomonas
- Species: P. taetrolens

Binomial name
- Pseudomonas taetrolens Haynes 1957

Type strain
- ATCC 4683 CCUG 560; CFBP 5592; CIP 103299; LMG 2336; NCTC 10697; NRRL B-14 and B-731; VKM B-904

Synonyms
- Pseudomonas graveolens (Migula 1900) Levine and Anderson 1932

Species of bacterium

Pseudomonas taetrolens is a Gram-negative, nonsporulating, motile, rod-shaped bacterium that causes mustiness in eggs. Based on 16S rRNA analysis, P. taetrolens has been placed in the P. chlororaphis group.
