= Obafluorin =

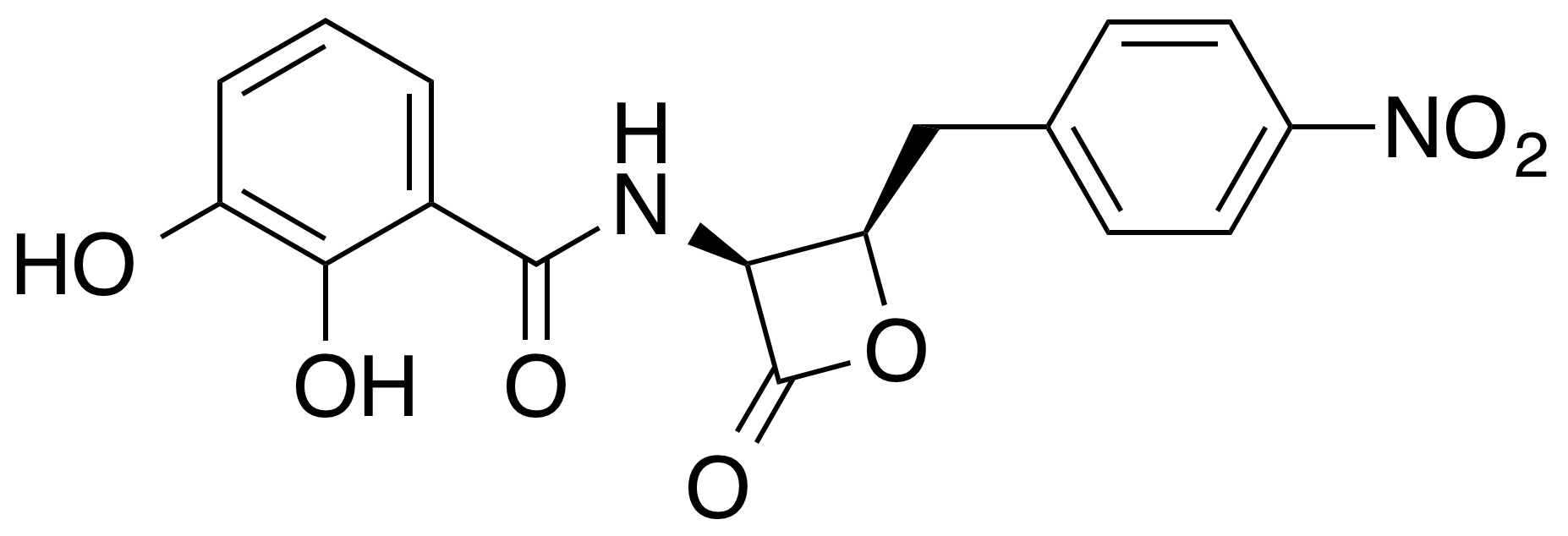

Names
- IUPAC name 2,3-dihydroxy-N-[(2R,3S)-2-[(4-nitrophenyl)methyl]-4-oxooxetan-3-yl]benzamide

Identifiers
CAS Number	92121-68-1
3D model (JSmol)	Interactive image
ChEBI	CHEBI:199965
ChemSpider	129096
PubChem CID	146354
CompTox Dashboard (EPA)	90238870
- InChI: InChI=1S/C17H14N2O7/c20-12-3-1-2-11(15(12)21)16(22)18-14-13(26-17(14)23)8-9-4-6-10(7-5-9)19(24)25/h1-7,13-14,20-21H,8H2,(H,18,22)/t13-,14+/m1/s1 Key: AINNQKIVZOTQBB-KGLIPLIRSA-N
- SMILES: C1=CC(=C(C(=C1)O)O)C(=O)N[C@H]2[C@H](OC2=O)CC3=CC=C(C=C3)[N+](=O)[O-]

Properties
Chemical formula	C_{17}H_{14}N_{2}O_{7}
Molar mass	358.306 g·mol^{−1}
- Except where otherwise noted, data are given for materials in their standard state (at 25 °C [77 °F], 100 kPa). Infobox references

Obafluorin is a β-lactone antibiotic with the molecular formula C_{17}H_{14}N_{2}O_{7}. Obafluorin is produced by the bacterium Pseudomonas fluorescens. Obafluorin is a inhibitor of serine hydroxymethyltransferase.
