= Janthinobacterium agaricidamnosum =

Scientific classification
- Domain: Bacteria
- Kingdom: Pseudomonadati
- Phylum: Pseudomonadota
- Class: Betaproteobacteria
- Order: Burkholderiales
- Family: Oxalobacteraceae
- Genus: Janthinobacterium
- Species: J. agaricidamnosum

Binomial name
- Janthinobacterium agaricidamnosum Lincoln et al. 1999

Type strain
- CCUG 43140, CIP 106332, DSM 9628, DSMZ 3945, IAM 14973, ICMP 16941, JCM 21444, NBRC 102515, NCPPB 3945, W1r3, W1R3

Species of bacterium

Janthinobacterium agaricidamnosum is a bacterium of the family Oxalobacteraceae and the genus Janthinobacterium that causes a soft rot disease of Agaricus bisporus. Because of this ability, it could help treating diseases caused by fungi in humans. Analyses have shown that jagaricin, a substance which is produced by J. agaricidamnosum, could have a major part for its antimycotic activity.

== Etymology ==
J. agaricidamnosum comes from the Latin word agaricum, which means fungus and the Latin verb damnous, which means destruction (damnosusum = destructive). Agaricidamnosum = damaging mushroom.
