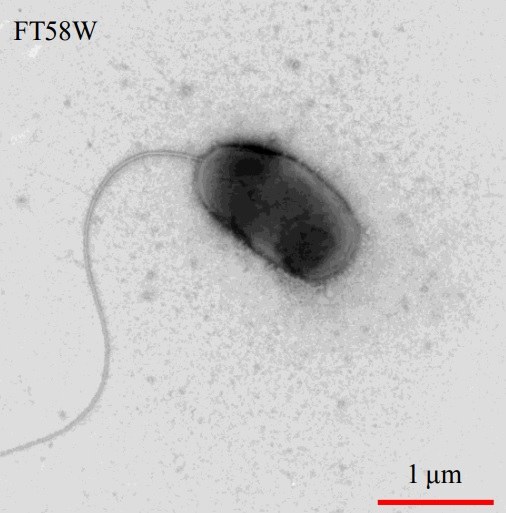

Scientific classification
- Domain: Bacteria
- Kingdom: Pseudomonadati
- Phylum: Pseudomonadota
- Class: Betaproteobacteria
- Order: Burkholderiales
- Family: Oxalobacteraceae
- Genus: Janthinobacterium
- Species: J. aquaticum

Binomial name
- Janthinobacterium aquaticum Lu et al. 2020

= Janthinobacterium aquaticum =

Species of bacterium

Janthinobacterium aquaticum is a Gram-negative, rod-shaped and motile bacterium from the genus of Janthinobacterium.
