= Pseudomonas lundensis =

Scientific classification
- Domain: Bacteria
- Kingdom: Pseudomonadati
- Phylum: Pseudomonadota
- Class: Gammaproteobacteria
- Order: Pseudomonadales
- Family: Pseudomonadaceae
- Genus: Pseudomonas
- Species: P. lundensis

Binomial name
- Pseudomonas lundensis Molin, et al. Molin et al. 1986

Type strain
- ATCC 49968 CCM 3503; CCUG 18757; CFBP 4564; CIP 103272; DSM 6252; LMG 13517; VKM B-2183

Species of bacterium

Pseudomonas lundensis is a Gram-negative, rod-shaped bacterium that often causes spoilage of milk, cheese, meat, and fish. Based on 16S rRNA analysis, P. lundensis has been placed in the P. chlororaphis group.
