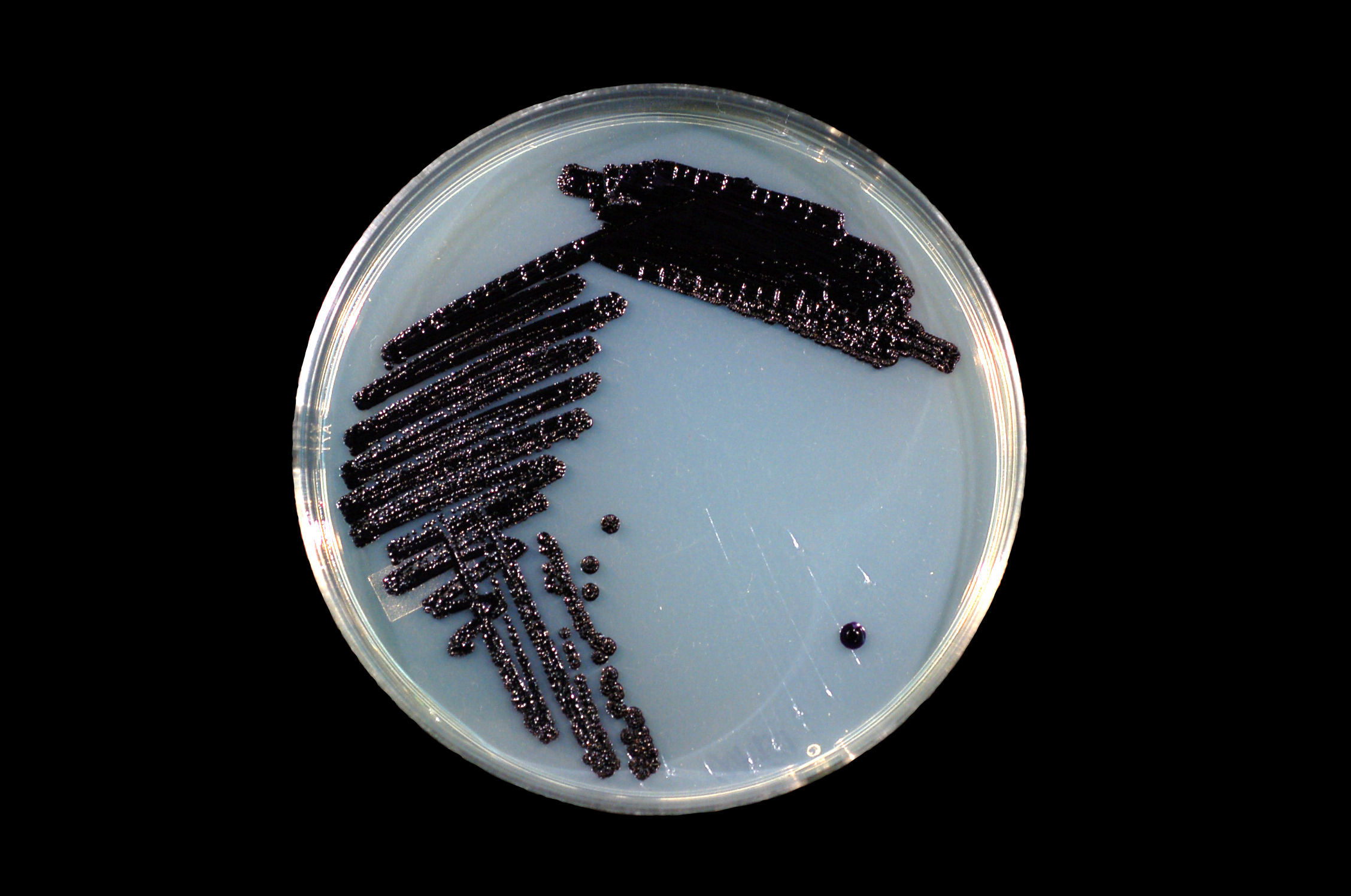
- The bacterium Janthinobacterium lividum on a TY agar plate

Scientific classification
- Domain: Bacteria
- Kingdom: Pseudomonadati
- Phylum: Pseudomonadota
- Class: Betaproteobacteria
- Order: Burkholderiales
- Family: Oxalobacteraceae
- Genus: Janthinobacterium; De Ley et al. 1978 (Approved Lists 1980) emend. Lincoln et al. 1999

Type species
- Janthinobacterium lividum

Species
- J. agaricidamnosum J. aquaticum J. lividum J. psychrotolerans J. rivuli J. svalbardensis J. violaceinigrum

= Janthinobacterium =

Genus of bacteria

Janthinobacterium is a genus of Gram-negative soil bacteria. The name is from Latin janthinus, which means "violet" or "violet-blue". It produces distinct purple-violet pigments among which are jagaricin and violacein, manifests diverse energy metabolism abilities, and tolerates cold, ultraviolet radiation, and other environmental stressors.
