= Indole-3-carbaldehyde =

Names
- IUPAC name 1H-Indole-3-carbaldehyde
- Other names 3-Formylindole; Indole-3-carboxaldehyde; Indole-3-aldehyde

Identifiers
CAS Number	487-89-8
3D model (JSmol)	Interactive image
Beilstein Reference	5-21-08-00246
ChEMBL	ChEMBL147741
ChemSpider	9838
ECHA InfoCard	100.006.969
EC Number	207-665-8
PubChem CID	10256
UNII	7FN04C32UO
CompTox Dashboard (EPA)	DTXSID5060069
- InChI: InChI=1S/C9H7NO/c11-6-7-5-10-9-4-2-1-3-8(7)9/h1-6,10H Key: OLNJUISKUQQNIM-UHFFFAOYSA-N
- SMILES: C1=CC=C2C(=C1)C(=CN2)C=O

Properties
Chemical formula	C_{9}H_{7}NO
Molar mass	145.161 g·mol^{−1}
Melting point	198 °C (388 °F; 471 K)

Structure
Crystal structure	Orthorhombic
Space group	Pca21
Lattice constant	a = 14.076, b = 5.8059, c = 8.6909
Lattice volume (V)	710.3
Formula units (Z)	4

Hazards
- GHS labelling
Pictograms	(GHS07: Exclamation mark)
Signal word	Warning
Hazard statements	H315, H319, H335
Precautionary statements	P261, P264, P271, P280, P302+P352, P304+P340, P305+P351+P338, P312, P321, P332+P313, P337+P313, P362, P403+P233, P405, P501
- Except where otherwise noted, data are given for materials in their standard state (at 25 °C [77 °F], 100 kPa). Infobox references

Indole-3-carbaldehyde (I3A), also known as indole-3-aldehyde and 3-formylindole, is a metabolite of dietary L-tryptophan which is synthesized by human gastrointestinal bacteria, particularly species of the Lactobacillus genus. I3A is a biologically active metabolite which acts as a receptor agonist at the aryl hydrocarbon receptor in intestinal immune cells, in turn stimulating the production of interleukin-22 which facilitates mucosal reactivity.

== Biosynthesis in humans and cellular effects ==
Tryptophan metabolism by human gut microbiota ()
This diagram shows the biosynthesis of bioactive compounds (indole and certain other derivatives) from tryptophan by bacteria in the gut. Indole is produced from tryptophan by bacteria that express tryptophanase. Clostridium sporogenes metabolizes tryptophan into indole and subsequently 3-indolepropionic acid (IPA), a highly potent neuroprotective antioxidant that scavenges hydroxyl radicals. IPA binds to the pregnane X receptor (PXR) in intestinal cells, thereby facilitating mucosal homeostasis and barrier function. Following absorption from the intestine and distribution to the brain, IPA confers a neuroprotective effect against cerebral ischemia and Alzheimer's disease. Lactobacillaceae (Lactobacillus s.l.) species metabolize tryptophan into indole-3-aldehyde (I3A) which acts on the aryl hydrocarbon receptor (AhR) in intestinal immune cells, in turn increasing interleukin 22 (IL-22) production. Indole itself triggers the secretion of glucagon-like peptide-1 (GLP-1) in intestinal L cells and acts as a ligand for AhR. Indole can also be metabolized by the liver into indoxyl sulfate, a compound that is toxic in high concentrations and associated with vascular disease and renal dysfunction. AST-120 (activated charcoal), an intestinal sorbent that is taken by mouth, adsorbs indole, in turn decreasing the concentration of indoxyl sulfate in blood plasma.

== Chemistry ==
Indole-3-carbaldehyde has reactivity typical of aromatic aldehydes. It can is easily oxidized to indole-3-carboxylic acid. It condenses with nitromethane in a Henry reaction to give 3-nitrovinyl indole.

== Antifungal properties ==
Indole-3-carbaldehyde has antifungal properties, and partially accounts for the protection from chytridiomycosis seen in amphibian species which carry Janthinobacterium lividum on their skin.
