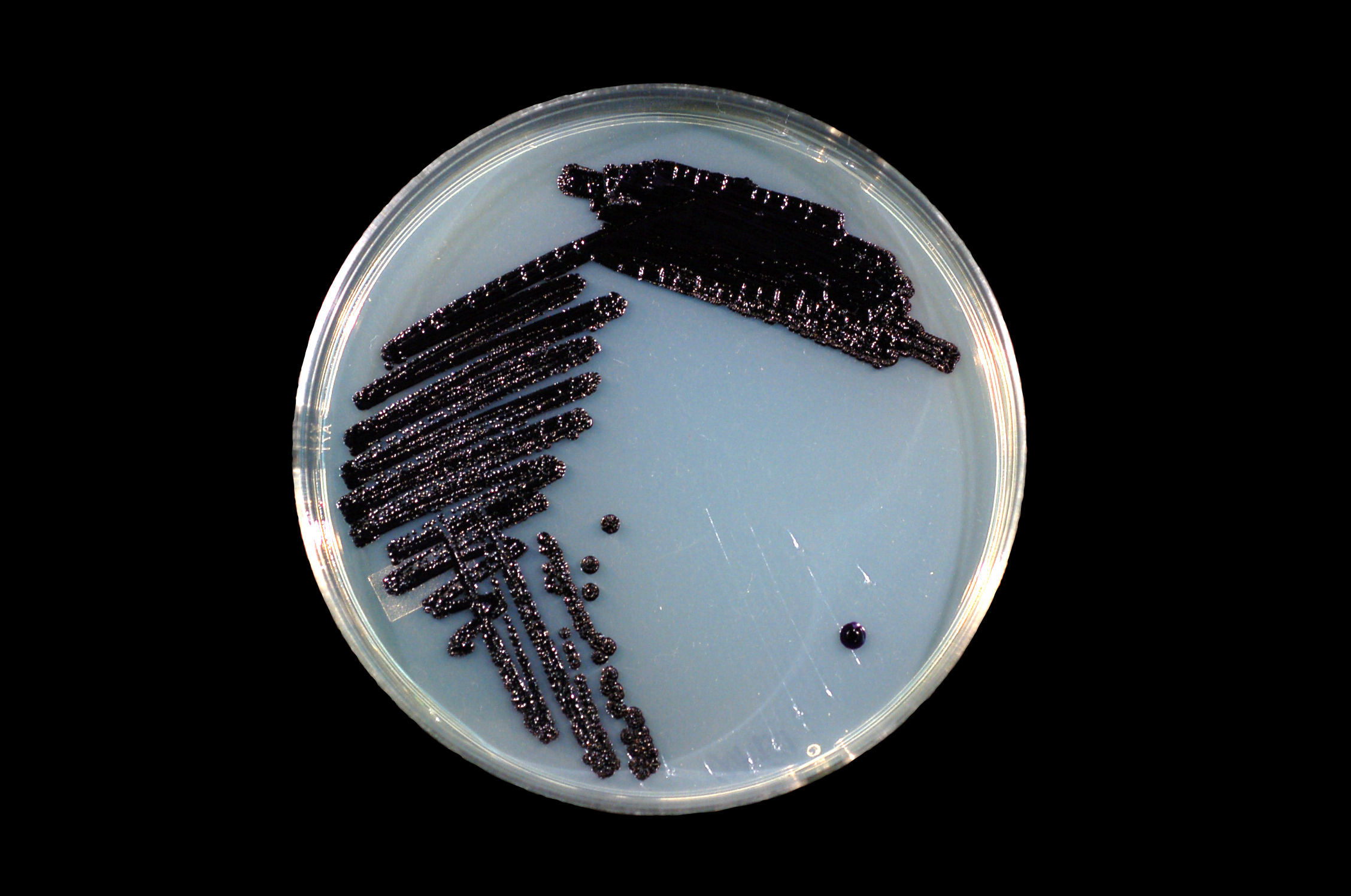

Scientific classification
- Domain: Bacteria
- Kingdom: Pseudomonadati
- Phylum: Pseudomonadota
- Class: Betaproteobacteria
- Order: Burkholderiales
- Family: Oxalobacteraceae
- Genus: Janthinobacterium
- Species: J. lividum

Binomial name
- Janthinobacterium lividum (Eisenberg 1891) De Ley et al. 1978 (Approved Lists 1980)

Type strain
- ATCC 12473; CCUG 2344; CIP 103349; DSM 1522; HAMBI 1919; JCM 9043; LMG 2892; NCTC 9796; VKM B-1223

Synonyms
- Bacillus lividus Eisenberg 1891; Bacillus violaceus berolinensis Kruse 1896; Bacterium lividus [sic] (Eisenberg 1891) Chester 1897; Bacillus berolinensis Chester 1901; Chromobacterium lividum (Eisenberg 1891) Bergey et al. 1923; Chromobacterium violaceum Ford 1927; Chromobacterium amethystinum Breed et al. 1957; Chromobacterium violaceum Leifson 1956; Pseudomonas mephitica Claydon and Hammer 1939

= Janthinobacterium lividum =

Species of bacterium

Janthinobacterium lividum is an aerobic, Gram-negative, soil-dwelling bacterium that has a distinctive dark-violet (almost black) color, due to a compound called violacein, which is produced when glycerol is metabolized as a carbon source. Violacein has antibacterial, antiviral, and antifungal properties. Its antifungal properties are of particular interest, since J. lividum is found on the skin of certain amphibians, including the red-backed salamander (Plethodon cinereus), where it prevents infection by the devastating chytrid fungus (Batrachochytrium dendrobatidis).

== Etymology ==
The genus name, Janthinobacterium, comes from the Latin janthinus, which means "violet" or "violet-blue" + bacterium, which means rod or staff. The species name is also from the Latin, lividum, which means "of a blue or leaden color".

== Antifungal properties ==
This bacterium produces antifungal compounds, such as indole-3-carboxaldehyde and violacein.

== Resistance to B. dendrobatidis ==
J. lividum inhibits the toxic effect and growth of the fungal genus Batrachochytrium. This fungus causes a disease known as chytridiomycosis in amphibians. It is contributing to the massive declines of amphibians around the world, so understanding the uses of these bacteria has been of major interest.

A study conducted in 2009 explored the effects of Bd and the use of J. lividium in the lab for survival. The three experimental treatments were: frogs infected with Bd, frogs given the bacterium J. lividium, and frogs with the given bacterium and then exposed to Bd. Nearly all of the frogs exposed to Bd alone experienced mortality, while none of the other treatments had any deaths. This effectively introduced the use of J. lividium as a possible method for Bd prevention in the lab setting.

== Textile dyeing ==
The pigment produced by J. lividum is also being used to colour textile. The biodegradable pigment could be an alternative to synthetic textile dyes that contain harmful chemicals and heavy metals.
