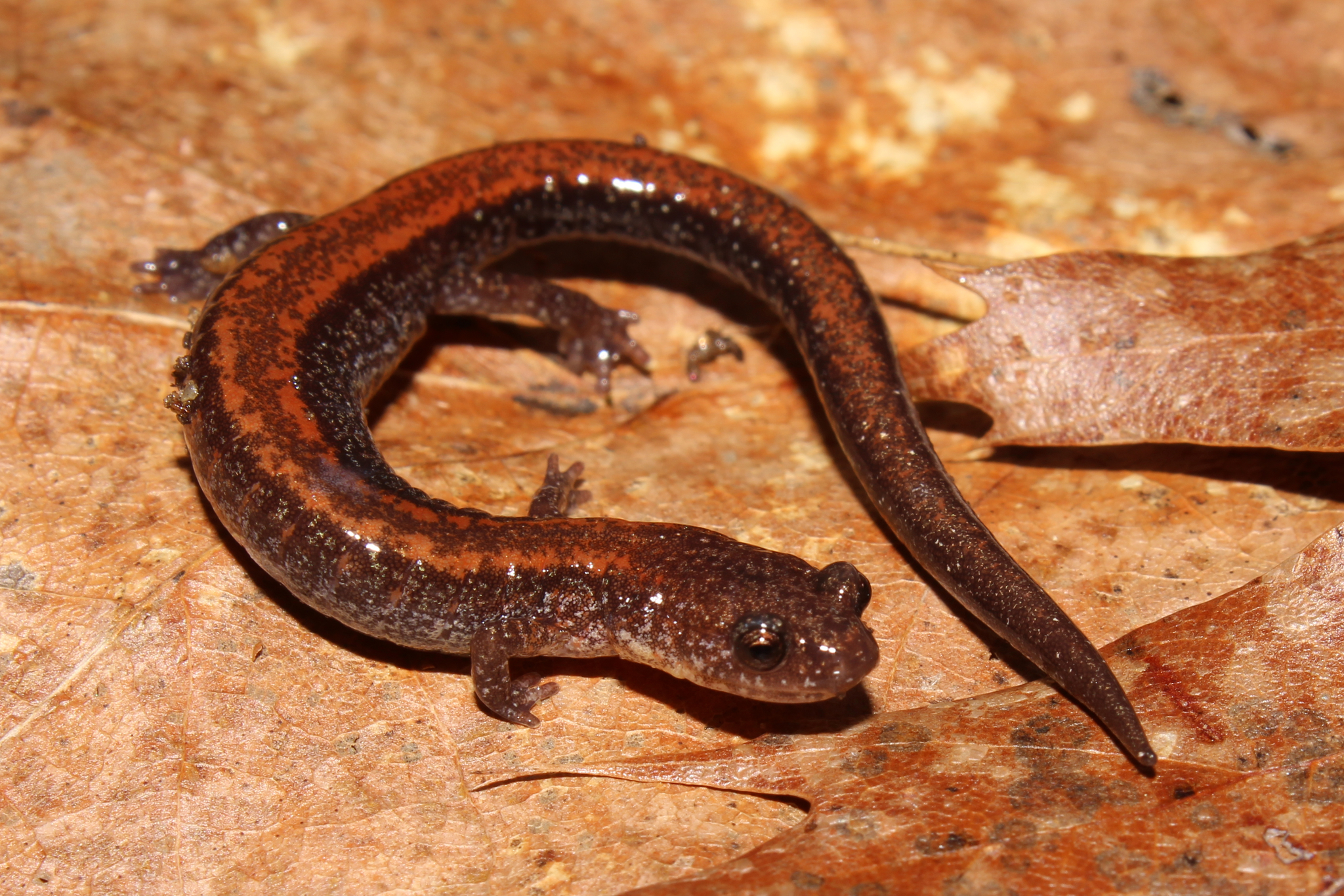
- "Redback" phase
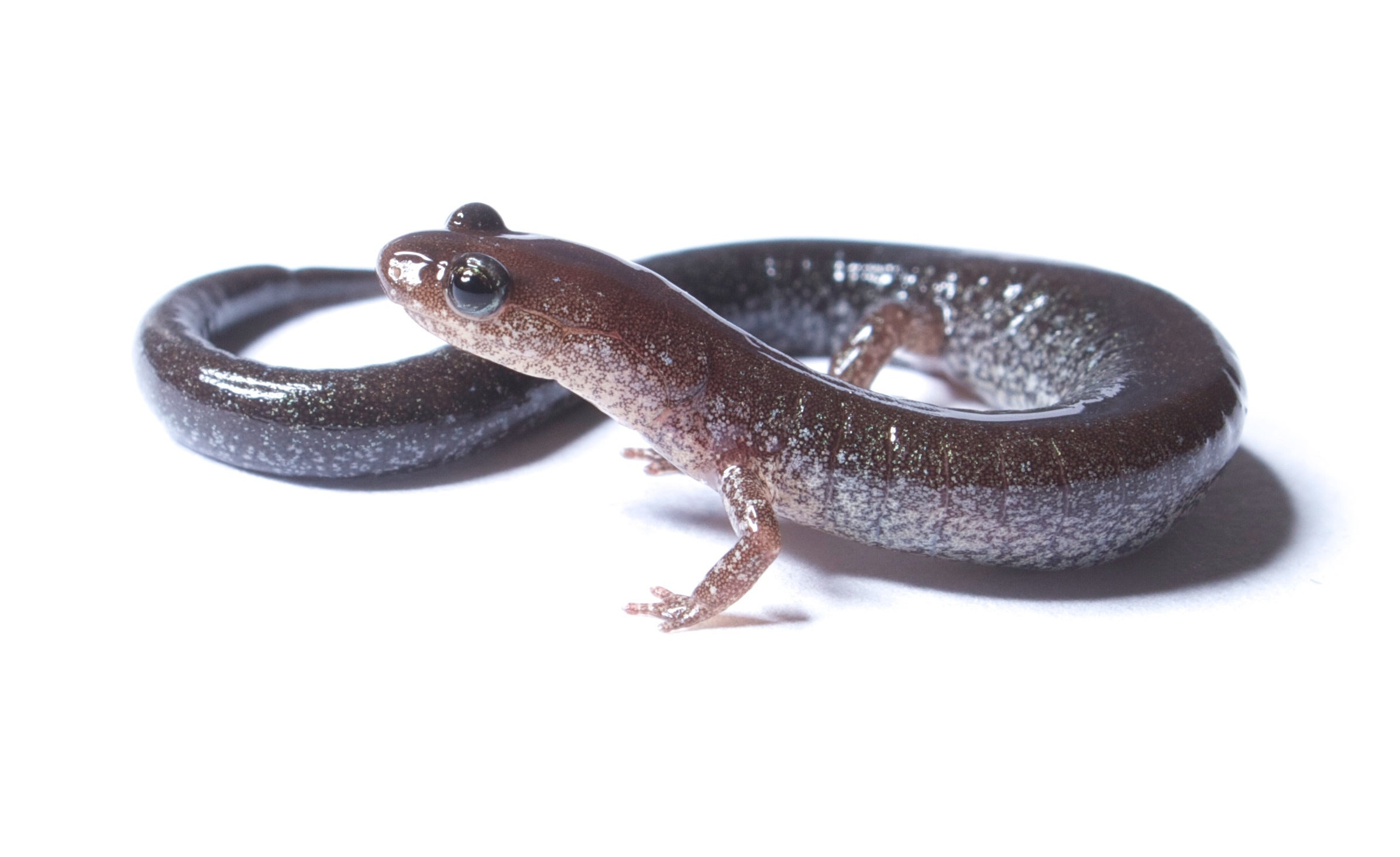
- "Leadback" phase

Conservation status
- Least Concern (IUCN 3.1)

Scientific classification
- Kingdom: Animalia
- Phylum: Chordata
- Class: Amphibia
- Order: Urodela
- Family: Plethodontidae
- Genus: Plethodon
- Species: P. cinereus

Binomial name
- Plethodon cinereus (Green, 1818)
- Range of P. cinereus

Synonyms
- Salamandra cinerea Green, 1818; Plethodon cinereus — Tschudi, 1838

= Red-backed salamander =

Species of amphibian

The red-backed salamander (Plethodon cinereus) is a small, hardy woodland salamander species in the family Plethodontidae. It is also known as the redback salamander, eastern red-backed salamander, or the northern red-backed salamander to distinguish it from the southern red-backed salamander (Plethodon serratus). The species inhabits wooded slopes in eastern North America, west to Missouri, south to North Carolina, and north from southern Quebec and the Maritime provinces in Canada to Minnesota. It is one of 56 species in the genus Plethodon. Red-backed salamanders are notable for their color polymorphism and primarily display two color morph varieties ("red-backed" and "lead-backed"), which differ in physiology and anti-predator behavior.

== Description and ecology ==
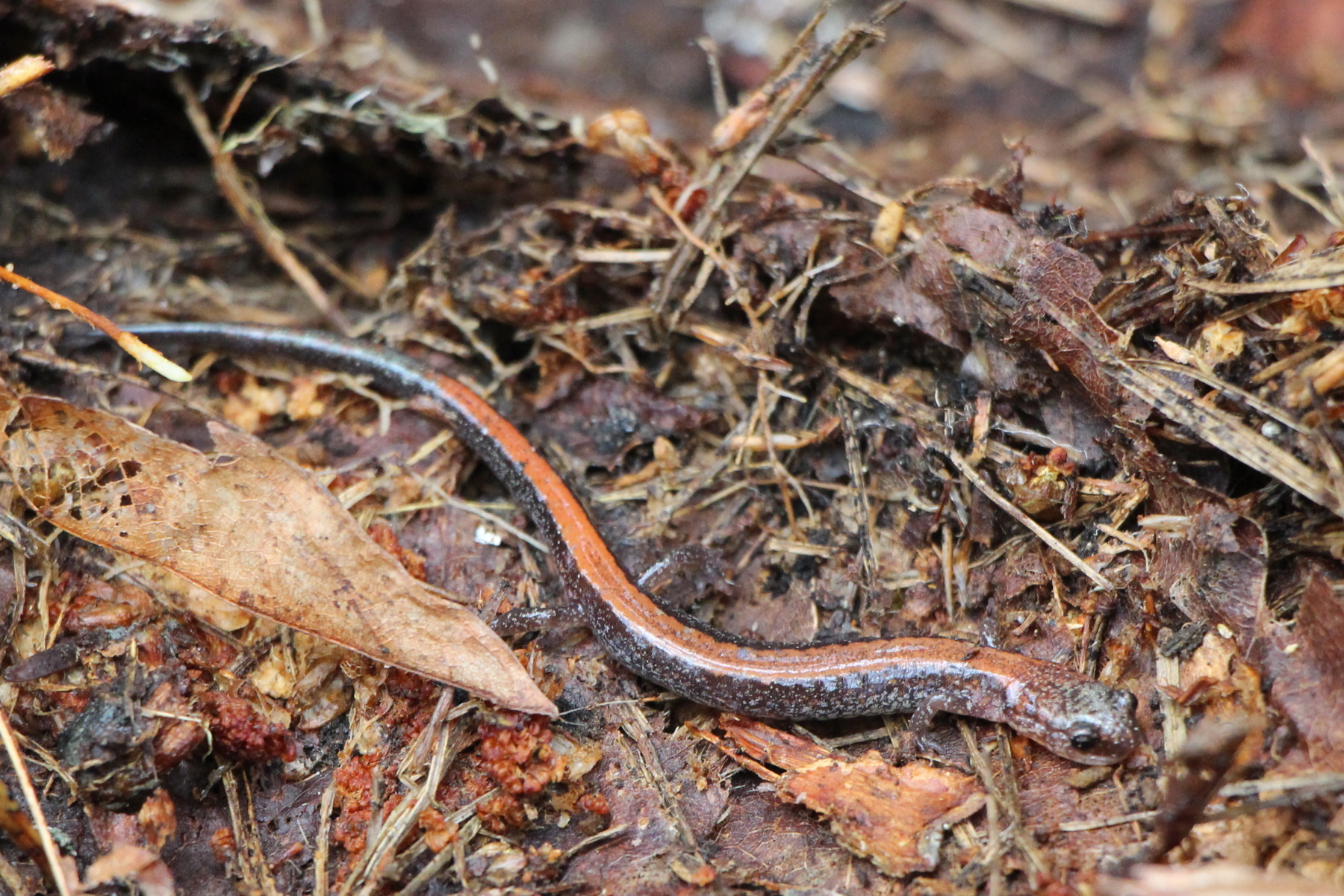
Red-backed salamander in its habitat

The red-backed salamander is a small terrestrial salamander, 5.7–10.0 cm (2.2–3.9 in) in total length (including tail), which usually lives in forested areas under rocks, logs, bark, and other debris. It is one of the most numerous salamanders throughout its range.

As with all amphibians, the red-backed salamander has permeable skin. They also lack lungs, a condition which is an ancestral trait of the Plethodontidae. Red-backed salamanders are thus entirely reliant on cutaneous respiration for gas exchange. Permeable skin is susceptible to desiccation and must be kept moist in order to facilitate cutaneous respiration; as a result, much of the ecology and behavior of the red-backed salamander is restricted by climatic and microclimatic variables, particularly dryness and temperature.

The skin of red-backed salamanders was found to contain Lysobacter gummosus, an epibiotic bacterium that produces the chemical 2,4-diacetylphloroglucinol and inhibits the growth of certain pathogenic fungi.

=== Polymorphism ===
Plethodon cinereus exhibits color polymorphism, the common ones being the red-striped morph and the lead-phase. The "red-backed" or "red-stripe" variety has a red dorsal stripe that tapers towards the tail, and the darker variety, known as the "lead-backed" (or simply "lead") phase, lacks most or all of the red pigmentation. The red-backed phase is not always red, but may actually be various other colors (e.g., yellow-backed, orange-backed, white-backed, or a rare erythristic morph in which the body is completely red). Both morphs have speckled black and white bellies. Additional color anomalies of this species also exist, including iridistic, albino, leucistic, amelanistic, and melanistic anomalies. These color morphs are rarer than the red-backed, lead-backed, and erythristic morphs, but still have been reported with consistency among varying populations of this species.

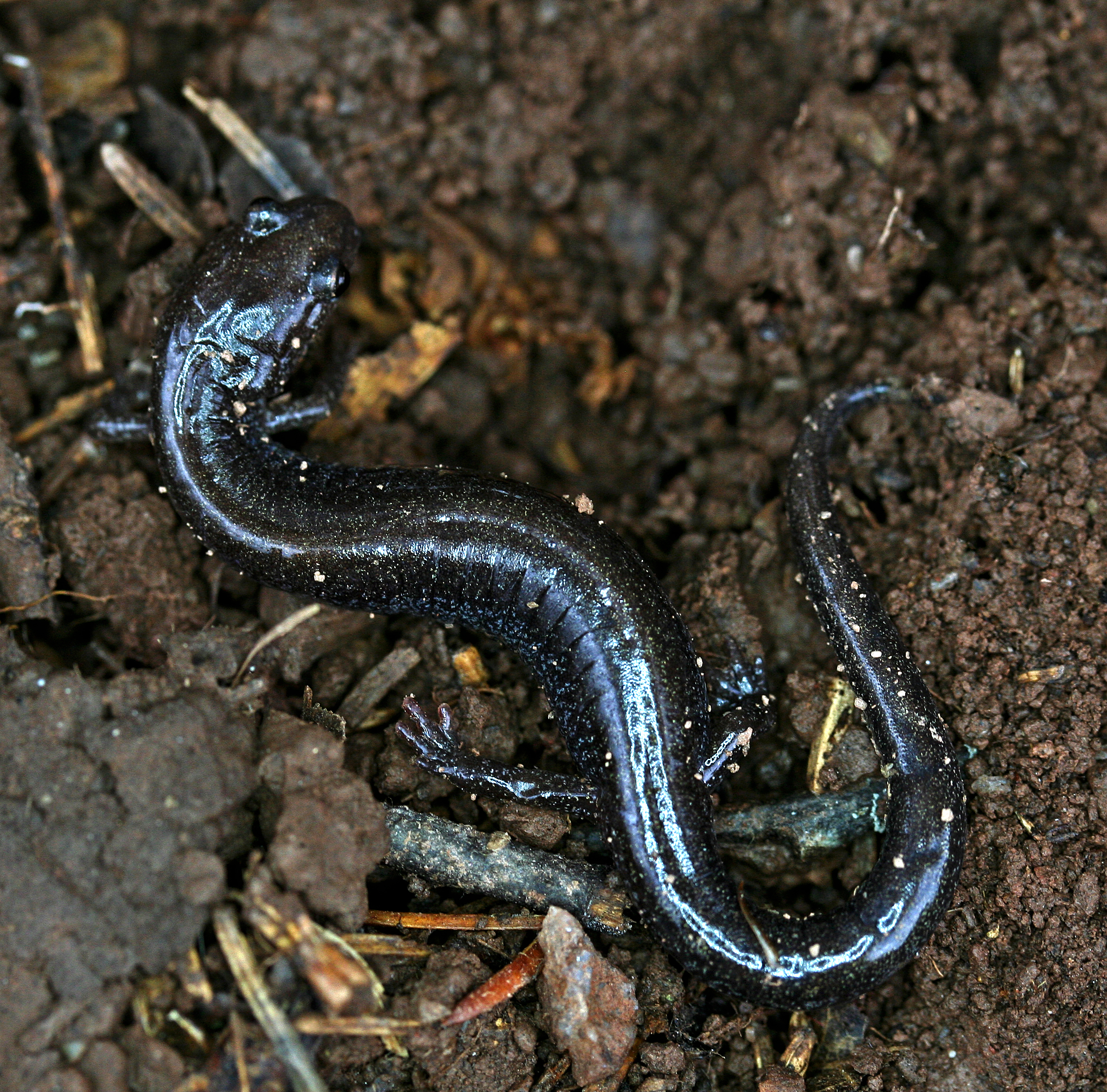
Lead-backed phase redback salamander - Plethodon cinereus

== Evolution of color polymorphism ==
Color polymorphism is thought to be an adaptive strategy in a heterogeneous environment, so the maintenance of polymorphism is derived from behavioral and physiological choices. The color polymorphism of the red-striped morph Plethodon cinereus and the lead-phase Plethodon cinereus show different anti-predator responses in behavior, and predators attack differently based on the color form. Compared to red-striped morph P. cinereus which prefers an "all trunk raised" posture and tends to stay still, the lead-phase P. cinereus is significantly more mobile. Moreover, lead-phase P. cinereus has the ability to automatically cut off the tail, indicating that the two forms also differ in the frequency of being attacked.

As evidence that polymorphism is an adaptation to the environment, P. cinereus color morph frequencies are correlated with climatic variables, suggesting habitat temperature and, more broadly, climate to be potential sources of selective pressure on P. cinereus polymorphism. The red-backed form is found with greater frequency in colder regions at more northerly latitudes and easterly longitudes throughout its range, whereas the opposite is true of the lead-backed form. Additionally, lead-backed morphs withdraw from surface activity earlier in the autumn than red-backed morphs, presumably to avoid cooling temperatures. Standard metabolic rate has also been found to differ between the morphs at certain temperatures, with significantly lower metabolic rates being displayed by the lead-backed form at 15 °C; in the same study, lead-backed individuals were also more active on the ground surface at this temperature. These findings suggest that the lead-backed color variant is less tolerant of cool temperatures than the red-backed color variant, and that the two color forms differ physiologically and behaviorally at certain temperatures.

An alternate explanation for the uneven geographic distribution of the red-backed and lead-backed P. cinereus color morphs involves phenotypic plasticity responding to developmental temperature. Although the genetic origins of the P. cinereus polymorphic condition are not fully understood, initial studies indicate that color morph dominance is likely subject to epistasis, and that multiple loci may interact to determine an individual's morph condition. However, more recent research indicates that a plastic response to thermal conditions during development also contributes to color morph determination; in one study, P. cinereus eggs incubated at a higher temperature hatched a greater proportion of lead-backed morphs than eggs incubated at a lower temperature. Temperature-dependent color morph determination may therefore also potentially influence the spatial distribution of P. cinereus color morphs.

== Diet ==
Red-backed salamanders are mostly insectivorous, but prey on a wide assortment of other small invertebrates including isopods, millipedes, centipedes, pseudoscorpions, harvestmen, spiders, and gastropods.

The two primary P. cinereus color morphs also differ in diet. The prevalence of certain prey taxa and the overall diversity and quality of prey items have been observed to differ seasonally between the two morphs in the spring and autumn when surface activity is greatest. The diets of striped and unstriped P. cinereus differ the most in the spring and fall seasons. The striped salamanders have a red-colored dorsal band that runs from the head/neck to their tail, and the unstriped ones lack this red stripe and are instead totally black. These salamanders are at the surface the most during these seasons. Contrasting diets during the fall and spring are due to differences in two types of prey consumed during this time. In the fall, the striped salamanders eat more entomobryomorph Collembola, the largest species of elongated springtails, as opposed to in the spring when they eat more oribatid mites.

Some studies have suggested that the unstriped morph has adapted to be better suited for drier and warmer conditions explaining the differences in diets. Unstriped morphs are less aggressive and less likely to hold territories because they are more well suited to find a territory that these striped salamanders are less adapted to withstand. The unstriped salamanders can forage in drier leaf litter, so they do not need to protect their territory to the extent that striped morphs do. The less pressure the unstriped salamander feels to hold territory does change what type of access of prey it has access to compared to the striped salamander during the drier months. Striped salamanders defend territories underneath objects such as rocks and logs when the conditions are dry. During these dry conditions, arthropods are forced to hide in these same moist areas that the striped salamanders claim as their territory since some arthropods will desiccate in dry periods. These arthropods then become the (red-backed) striped salamander's prey while the unstriped salamanders miss this opportunity. This allows striped salamanders to feed on springtails, mites, ants, and other small invertebrates.

There are some disputes on which morph has the more diverse diet. In one study, the autumn diet of red-backed morphs was more diverse and of higher quality, and found to be dominated by mites, springtails, and ants, whereas the most important prey for lead-backed morphs were ants, mites, and isopods. A later study notes that this was because the earlier study only compared diets during the fall season, while the later study compared their diets throughout all of the seasons. The later study concludes that the unstriped morph has a broader diet and encounters prey the striped morph does not. They link this back to unstriped salamanders being able to roam more freely between drier territories during this time.

== Distribution ==
Distribution of P. cinereus are in close contact with the soil on the forest floor. As deciduous forests mature, acid deposition can accelerate the acidification of soils. Acidic conditions can limit the distribution of amphibians and the numbers of sibling species, while the pH value of soil has a strong effect on the density and distribution of P. cinereus. When choosing between acidic and neutral soils, P. cinereus prefers to occupy more neutral soils. P. cinereus is rarely found in soils with a pH value of 3.7, and relatively more to be found in soils with a pH value of about 3.8 or higher. Juvenile P. cinereus have never been found in soils with a pH value lower than 3.7. Similar conclusions have also been supported in the laboratory. P. cinereus prefers to occupy substrates near neutral pH. A pH value between 2.5 and 3 results in acute mortality, while a pH value between 3 and 4 results in chronic mortality. Low pH will reduce their growth and respiration. Slowed growth and delayed metamorphosis make juvenile P. cinereus more vulnerable to predators and has serious consequences for population survival.

Several other factors, such as moisture and temperature, can affect the population density or dispersion of Botrytis as well. During prolonged dry periods, individuals move down into the soil, while during short dry periods they retreat under logs or rocks. They will avoid very warm areas, and when the temperature drops to 4–5 Celsius degrees, they will retreat to the ground as well. The optimum temperature is 10 to 15 Celsius degrees. Moreover, intraspecific and interspecific competition also affected the distribution of P. cinerea. Individuals confine themselves to moist microhabitats (beneath rocks, woody debris, etc. as well as beneath the soil) for long periods of time in order to maintain hydration when surface conditions are inhospitably dry or hot, and are only active on the surface to travel, forage, or reproduce for short periods. The duration of surface activity is directly limited by the rate of cutaneous water loss to the environment, which is influenced by environmental variables such as altitude, forest canopy cover, and the amount of recent precipitation.

Spatial distributions of the salamander Plethodon cinereus is observed to be seasonal. In spring, Plethodon cinereus are more likely to exist in groups of around 2 to 7 individuals under some object covers such as rocks and wood, than in the other seasons, while the density on the forest floor stays constant. This is because that spatial dispute starts in spring. A study in Blackrock Mountain, Virginia indicates that the mean number of salamanders in each quadrant of 100*100 m varies from 1.6 to 3 in spring compared to 0.8 to 1.8 in summer. A significant increase in the spatial distribution of P. cinereus from spring to summer is thought to be due to intraspecific interference competition. The cover objects on the ground can be a good choice of moisture refuge for P. cinereus during the rainy season. The failure of P. cinereus to forage underground causes them to restrict down to areas under and around the cover objects. Aggression and territoriality under resource, food and shelter limitation are the reasons for the observed spacing.

Moreover, the two morphologies have different standard metabolic rates, while lead-phase P. cinereus favor warm habitats or microclimates. So the strong argument is that the geographic distribution of color form is caused by the selection of physiological traits.

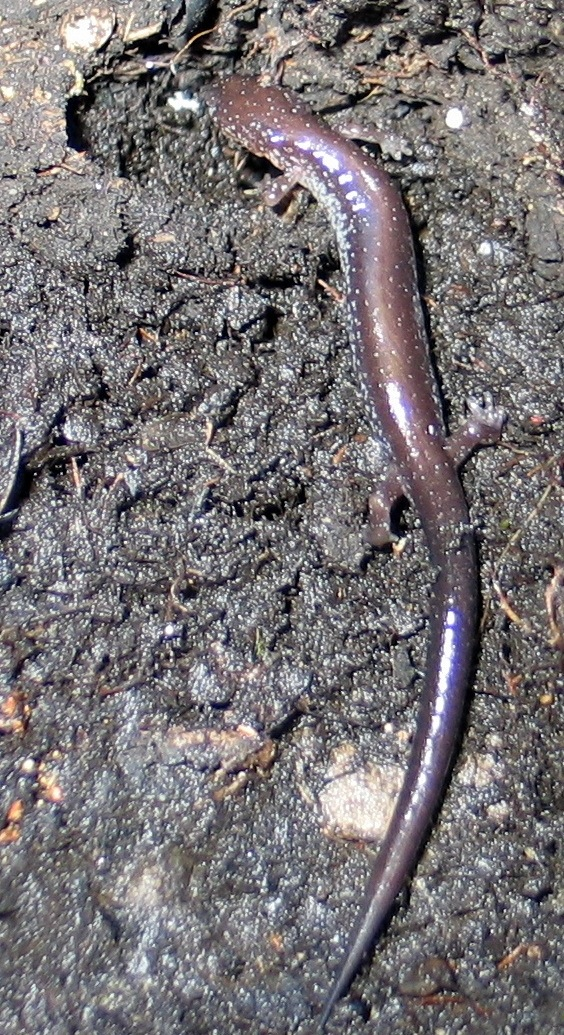
Lead-backed phase

== Behavior ==
Antipredator behavior of P. cinereus was found to differ between the two color phases; the lead-backed phase has a tendency to run away from predators, whereas the red-backed phase often stays immobile and possibly exhibits aposematic coloration. Stress levels of each color phase were estimated by determining the ratio of neutrophil to lymphocyte cells in the blood, and the results suggest stress levels are higher in the lead-backed phase than in the red-backed phase. This may be a consequence of a higher predation risk experienced in the wild by the lead-backed phase, and may also mean lead-phase salamanders could be more vulnerable in captivity settings.

== Home range and territoriality ==
Plethodon cinereus, like many plethodon species, exhibit homing behavior, with homing of females to their nests, as well as non-attending females and males to a home range. This allows for essential contact between a female and her eggs in order to ensure their survival, as well as for non-attending females and males to explore beyond the home range when under predation pressures, or searching for food or cover, and return to their home range if a more favorable microhabitat is not found.

Male Plethodon cinereus actively defends its territory from intrusion by other males and is less aggressive towards invading females and juveniles. Plethodon cinereus usually directs aggressive behavior towards conspecific as well as heterospecific, as long as it is thought to be a potential competitor. Plethodon cinereus positively interacts not only with conspecifics, but also with other potential competitors such as centipedes.

It is necessary to have a visual display in order to elicit the threat posture of P. cinereus, and there will be no obvious aggressive behavior toward conspecifics and heterospecifics if only chemical cues exist. However, P. cinereus will increase time spent in aggressive postures when paired with centipedes but did not show increased aggression when paired with conspecifics. The specific test method was to expose male P. cinereus to four substrate chemical cue treatments separately: control, self, conspecific, or centipede (Scolopocryptops sexspinosus) to determine its behavior in the presence or absence of conspecifics and heterospecific cues reaction.

Their residence status affects the attack level as well. Even if in different residency statuses, they do attack centipedes.

== Defense mechanisms against pathogens ==
Plethodon cinereus coexists with some bacteria. These bacteria help salamanders defend against fungal pathogens. For example, Batrachochytrium dendrobatidis, a fungal pathogen that causes a disease called chytridiomycosis, has led to a rapid decline in amphibian populations worldwide. Around one-third of amphibians are endangered because of the disease, but some species persist from the infection, and some even clear the pathogen. As evidence, the skin of P. cinereus harbors bacterial microsymbionts such as Janthinobacterium lividum, whose metabolites can inhibit the growth of pathogens. This finding suggests an idea for providing long-term protection to individual amphibians who are infected with chytridiomycosis. It also provides a research pathway for future drug development that uses novel antifungal compounds for the treatment of human pathogens.

== Reproduction and biomass ==
Males and females of P. cinereus typically establish separate feeding and/or mating territories underneath rocks and logs. However, some red-backed salamanders are thought to engage in social monogamy, and may maintain co-defended territories throughout their active periods. Breeding occurs in June and July. Females produce from four to 17 eggs in a year. The eggs hatch in 6 to 8 weeks. Not much is known about the dispersal of neonates, although neonates and juveniles are thought to be philopatric.

As in many Plethodon species, female red-backed salamanders have the ability to store sperm as spermatophore, and have been evidenced in doing so up to eight months prior to the oviposition period in June and July. Sperm or spermatophores are not retained following the oviposition period.

== Protective coloration and behavior ==
=== Mimicry ===
Lead-backed individuals are absent in northeastern United States and southeastern Canada. Instead, another phase called erythristic is observed and exclusive in these areas. This phase shows macro- and microgeographic variation in frequency. Regardless of the wide geographic variation, the highest frequency is always under 25%. This phase of P. cinereus mimic Notophthalmus viridescens to protect themselves. Birds selectively avoid preying upon all-red or erythristic color P. cinereus because they think that red color is a signal of noxiousness and toxicity. Even if people trained the birds to enhance the avoidance by increasing exposure to red efts (juvenile Notophthalmus viridescens), the frequencies of erythrism is never above 25%.

== Interactions with humans ==
Roads have various negative effects on animal populations. For example, a major source of direct mortality for many species is accidental collisions with moving vehicles. Due to the slow movement of amphibians, it is estimated that the mortality rate of these animals on roads is as high as 10% of the total population each year. From a genetic point of view, roads also reduce gene flow and thus divide animal populations, causing drift and loss of genetic diversity. Eventually, populations separated by roads may become more and more distinct from each other, thus losing the original population. Amongst different sizes of roads, it is known that the interstate highway leads to increased genetic differentiation of Plethodon cinereus by microsatellite examination. Genetic distances between regions on either side of an interstate highway were significantly larger than those between equally spaced quadrants on the same side of the highway. However, plots on smaller roads were not genetically different compared to that in the case of interstate highways. Narrow paved roads reduce the movement of redback salamanders by approximately 25–75% but do not eliminate the dynamic of the population. And the detection of genetic differences across the interstate means that the spread on this road is reduced by well over 25–75%. So there is little gene flow across very large roads, and the P. cinereus population diverges from each other. The indirect effect of smaller roads on genetic population structure is also not a big issue for terrestrial salamanders and is not a direct effect of mortality and habitat change.

The observed rate of dispersion in P. cinereus is far less than in most of the animals previously studied. Because P. cinereus have very high population densities, this should reduce the effects of genetic drift in isolated populations. From a conservation standpoint, red-backed salamanders are an important research organism because of their behavioral and physiological similarities to many threatened and endangered salamanders.

Moreover, salamanders are largely affected by forest management practices thus impacting the food web dynamics and nutrient cycling of the ecosystem they are residing in. In order to conserve the species, proper forest management practice is essential. For instance, even-aged timber harvesting practices are documented which show significantly low abundance and species richness of amphibian creatures in the area. SCE, so-called structural complexity enhancement, aims to promote the vertical development of differentiated canopies and make the horizontal density variable which then can help to rearrange the basal area, snag and log density. It turns out that SCE brings positive effects to the abundance of the Plethodon cincereus population.

== In popular culture ==
On December 17, 2024, the eastern red-backed salamander became the official amphibian of the District of Columbia.
