= Pseudomonas chlororaphis subsp. aurantiaca =

Scientific classification
- Domain: Bacteria
- Kingdom: Pseudomonadati
- Phylum: Pseudomonadota
- Class: Gammaproteobacteria
- Order: Pseudomonadales
- Family: Pseudomonadaceae
- Genus: Pseudomonas
- Species: P. chlororaphis
- Subspecies: P. c. subsp. aurantiaca

Trinomial name
- Pseudomonas chlororaphis subsp. aurantiaca (Nakhimovskaya, 1948) Peix et al., 2007

Synonyms
- Pseudomonas aurantiaca Nakhimovskaya, 1948

Species of bacterium

Pseudomonas chlororaphis subsp. aurantiaca is an orange Gram-negative soil bacterium, originally isolated from the rhizosphere soil of potatoes. It produces di-2,4-diacetylfluoroglucylmethan, which is antibiotically active against Gram-positive organisms. It has shown potential for use as a biocontrol agent against plant-pathogenic microbes. Originally described as Pseudomonas aurantiaca based on 16S rRNA analysis it has been placed in the P. chlororaphis group.

Isolates found in Ukraine living in root symbiosis produce 2,4-Diacetylphloroglucinol to control Fusarium oxysporum.
