= Dolphin Action and Protection Group =

South African organization, founded 1977

Dolphin Action and Protection Group is a non-governmental organization in South Africa which campaigns for the protection and conservation of dolphins and whales (cetaceans). The group was founded in 1977 by Nan Rice. DAPG has since then broadened its role and activities and has run many national educational and fundraising campaigns. Thousands of educational DAPG pamphlets are distributed each year through schools and libraries and also to fishermen and merchant vessels to prevent dumping of plastics at sea.

DAPG has also campaigned against high seas pelagic drift-netting which kills cetacean caught in the drift nets, and succeeded in phasing out this fishing technique in the southern Indian and Atlantic oceans. DAPG has collaborated with Marine and Coastal Management in the formation of a South African Whale Disentanglement Unit.

== Campaigns ==
- Save the Whales;
- Save Antarctica;
- Dolphins Should Be Free
- Save Our Sea Life – Prevent Plastic Pollution.
- Save the Great White Shark

== Publicity ==
DAPG hit headlines in May 2009 when a decision by a pod of whales to strand themselves on the beach at Kommetjie made news on CNN and BBC. DAPG immediately got into action and started calling up its trained volunteers to go to assist. Nan Rice, head of the Dolphin Action and Protection group said "mass strandings are extremely stressful for whales and to save stranding whales is an extremely difficult task".

DAPG had an important function in making South Africa the first country in the world to protect the great white shark in 1991. Key persons involved in making the protection possible were Nan Rice (DAPG), Leonard Compagno (University of Cape Town) and Theo Ferreira (former white shark fisherman).
