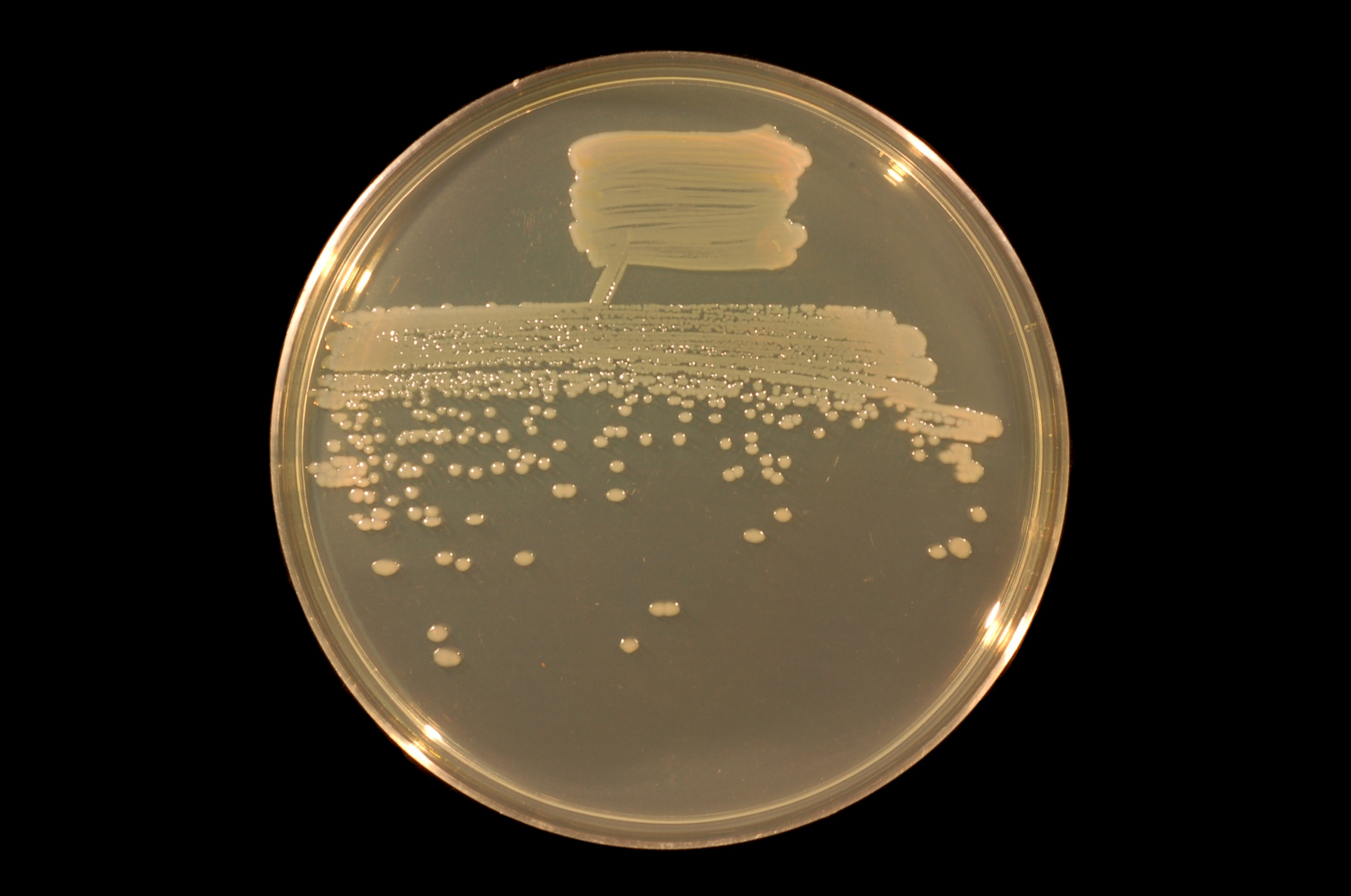
- Pseudomonas fluorescens under white light
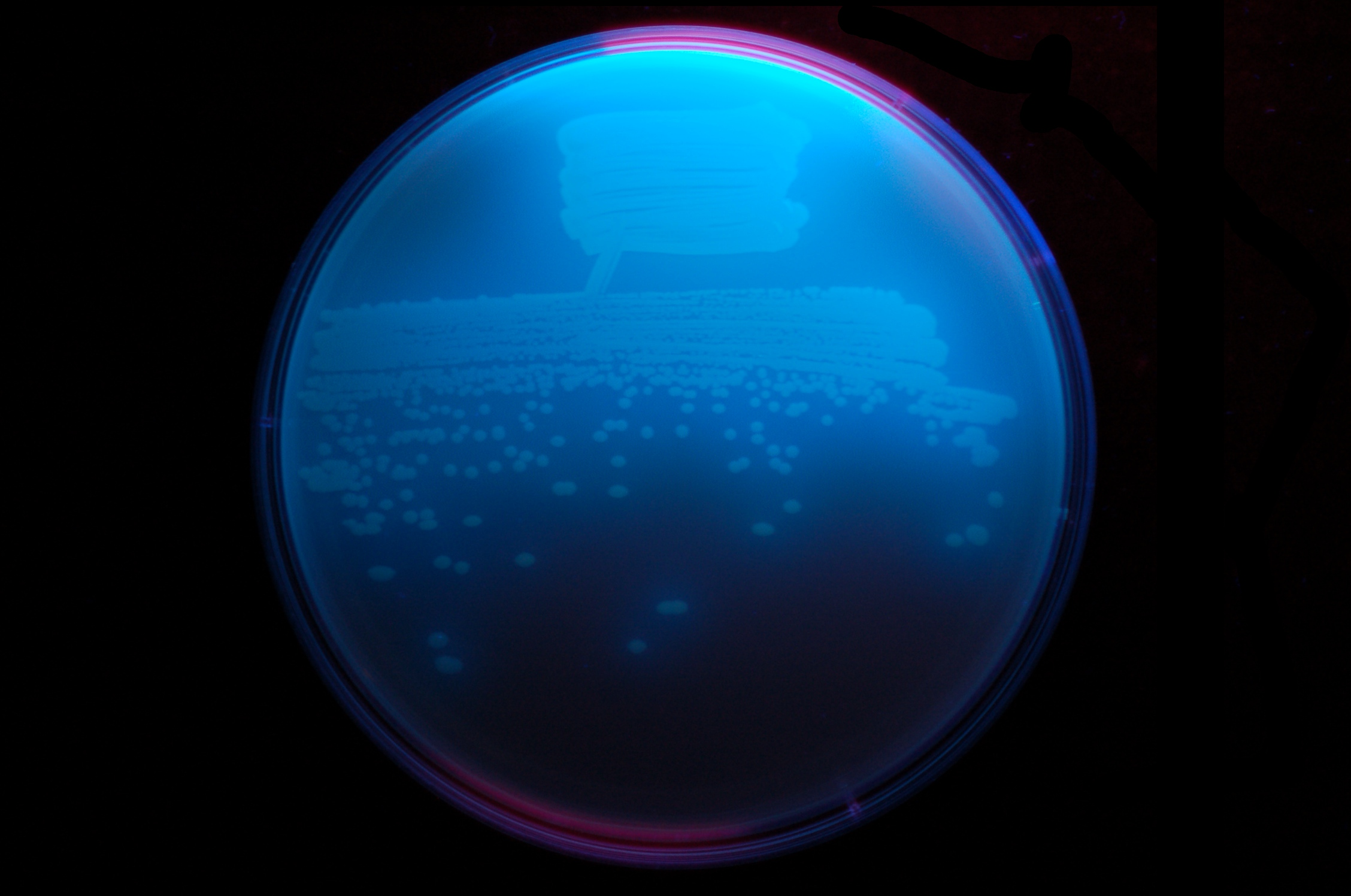
- The same plate under UV light

Scientific classification
- Domain: Bacteria
- Kingdom: Pseudomonadati
- Phylum: Pseudomonadota
- Class: Gammaproteobacteria
- Order: Pseudomonadales
- Family: Pseudomonadaceae
- Genus: Pseudomonas
- Species: P. fluorescens

Binomial name
- Pseudomonas fluorescens (Flügge 1886); Migula, 1895

Type strain
- ATCC 13525, CCUG 1253, CCEB 546, CFBP 2102, CIP 69.13, DSM 50090, JCM 5963, LMG 1794NBRC 14160, NCCB 76040, NCIMB 9046, NCTC 10038, NRRL B-14678, VKM B-894

Synonyms
- Bacillus fluorescens liquefaciens Flügge 1886; Bacillus fluorescens Trevisan 1889; Bacterium fluorescens (Trevisan 1889) Lehmann and Neumann 1896; Liquidomonas fluorescens (Trevisan 1889) Orla-Jensen 1909; Pseudomonas lemonnieri (Lasseur) Breed 1948; Pseudomonas schuylkilliensis Chester 1952; Pseudomonas washingtoniae (Pine) Elliott

= Pseudomonas fluorescens =

Species of bacterium

Pseudomonas fluorescens is a common Gram-negative, rod-shaped bacterium. It belongs to the Pseudomonas genus; 16S rRNA analysis as well as phylogenomic analysis has placed P. fluorescens in the P. fluorescens group within the genus, to which it lends its name.

== General characteristics ==
Pseudomonas fluorescens has multiple flagella, an extremely versatile metabolism, and can be found in the soil and in water. It is an obligate aerobe, but certain strains are capable of using nitrate instead of oxygen as a final electron acceptor during cellular respiration.

Optimal temperatures for growth of P. fluorescens are 25–30°C. It tests positive for the oxidase test, and is also a nonsaccharolytic bacterial species.

Heat-stable lipases and proteases are produced by P. fluorescens and other similar pseudomonads. These enzymes cause milk to spoil, by causing bitterness, casein breakdown, and ropiness due to production of slime and coagulation of proteins.

=== The name ===
The word Pseudomonas means false unit, being derived from the Greek words pseudēs (Greek: ψευδής – false) and monas (Latin: monas, from Greek: μονάς – a single unit). The word was used early in the history of microbiology to refer to germs. The specific name fluorescens refers to the microbe's secretion of a soluble fluorescent pigment called pyoverdin, which is a type of siderophore.

=== Genomics ===
Notable P. fluorescens strains SBW25, Pf-5 and PfO-1 have been sequenced, among others.

A comparative genomic study (in 2020) analyzed 494 complete genomes from the entire Pseudomonas genus, with 25 of them being annotated as P. fluorescens. The phylogenomic analysis clearly showed that the 25 strains annotated as P. fluorescens did not form a monophyletic group. In addition, their Average Nucleotide Identities did not fulfil the criteria of a species, since they were very diverse. It was concluded that P. fluorescens is not a species in the strict sense, but should be considered as a wider evolutionary group, or a species complex, that includes within it other species too. This finding is in accordance with previous analyses of 107 Pseudomonas species, using four core 'housekeeping' genes, that consider P. fluorescens as a relaxed species complex.

The P. fluorescens relaxed evolutionary group that was defined by Nikolaidis et al. on the basis of the genus phylogenomic tree, comprised 96 genomes and displayed high levels of phylogenetic heterogeneity. It comprised many species, such as Pseudomonas corrugata, Pseudomonas brassicacearum, Pseudomonas frederiksbergensis, Pseudomonas mandelii, Pseudomonas kribbensis, Pseudomonas koreensis, Pseudomonas mucidolens, Pseudomonas veronii, Pseudomonas antarctica, Pseudomonas azotoformans, Pseudomonas trivialis, Pseudomonas lurida, Pseudomonas poae, Pseudomonas libanensis, Pseudomonas synxantha, and Pseudomonas orientalis. The core proteome of the P. fluorescens group comprised 1396 proteins. The protein count and GC content of the strains of the P. fluorescens group ranged between 4152 and 6678 (average: 5603) and between 58.7–62% (average: 60.3%), respectively. Another comparative genomic analysis of 93 P. fluorescens genomes identified eight major subgroups and developed a set of nine genes as markers for classification within this lineage. A recent comparative genomic analysis of the P. fluorescens complex has further increased the number of major subgroups to 11.

=== Interactions with Dictyostelium ===
The slime mold Dictyostelium discoideum contains "farmer" individuals that live in association with Pseudomonas fluorescens. Two strains of the bacterium are associated with the farmer. One strain serves as a food source and the other strain serves as a symbiont that produces beneficial secondary metabolites. The main genetic difference between these two strains is a mutation of the global activator gene called gacA. This gene plays a key role in gene regulation; when this gene is knocked out in the nonfood bacterial strain, it loses its special secondary metabolites and, independently, is transformed into a food strain.

== Biocontrol properties ==
Some P. fluorescens strains (CHA0 or Pf-5, for example) present biocontrol properties, protecting the roots of some plant species against parasitic fungi such as Fusarium or the oomycete Pythium, as well as some phytophagous nematodes, and insect pests.

It is not clear exactly how the plant growth-promoting properties of P. fluorescens are achieved; theories include:

- The bacteria might induce systemic resistance in the host plant, so it can better resist attack by a true pathogen.
- The bacteria might outcompete other (pathogenic) soil microbes, e.g., by siderophores, giving a competitive advantage at scavenging for iron.
- The bacteria might produce compounds antagonistic to other soil microbes, such as phenazine-type antibiotics or hydrogen cyanide.

To be specific, certain P. fluorescens isolates produce the secondary metabolite 2,4-diacetylphloroglucinol (2,4-DAPG), the compound found to be responsible for antiphytopathogenic and biocontrol properties in these strains. The phl gene cluster encodes factors for 2,4-DAPG biosynthesis, regulation, export, and degradation. Eight genes, phlHGFACBDE, are annotated in this cluster and conserved organizationally in 2,4-DAPG-producing strains of P. fluorescens. Of these genes, phlD encodes a type III polyketide synthase, representing the key biosynthetic factor for 2,4-DAPG production. PhlD shows similarity to plant chalcone synthases and has been theorized to originate from horizontal gene transfer. Phylogenetic and genomic analysis, though, has revealed that the entire phl gene cluster is ancestral to P. fluorescens, many strains have lost the capacity, and it exists on different genomic regions among strains.

Some experimental evidence supports all of these theories, in certain conditions; a good review of the topic is written by Haas and Defago.

Several strains of P. fluorescens, such as Pf-5 and JL3985, have developed a natural resistance to ampicillin and streptomycin. These antibiotics are regularly used in biological research as a selective pressure tool to promote plasmid expression.

The strain referred to as Pf-CL145A has proved itself a promising solution for the control of invasive zebra mussels and quagga mussels (Dreissena). This bacterial strain is an environmental isolate capable of killing >90% of these mussels by intoxication (i.e., not infection), as a result of natural product(s) associated with their cell walls, and with dead Pf-145A cells killing the mussels equally as well as live cells. Following ingestion of the bacterial cells mussel death occurs following lysis and necrosis of the digestive gland and sloughing of stomach epithelium. Research to date indicates very high specificity to zebra and quagga mussels, with low risk of nontarget impact. Pf-CL145A has now been commercialized under the product name Zequanox, with dead bacterial cells as its active ingredient.

Recent results showed the production of the phytohormone cytokinin by P. fluorescens strain G20-18 to be critical for its biocontrol activity by activating plant resistance.

== Medical implications ==
By culturing P. fluorescens, mupirocin (an antibiotic) can be produced, which has been found to be useful in treating skin, ear, and eye disorders. Mupirocin free acid and its salts and esters are agents currently used in creams, ointments, and sprays as a treatment of methicillin-resistant Staphylococcus aureus infection.

Pseudomonas fluorescens demonstrates hemolytic activity, and as a result, has been known to infect blood transfusions.

Pseudomonas fluorescens produces the antibiotic obafluorin.

Recent case studies have reported instances of pneumonia caused by Pseudomonas fluorescens. These studies are significant as they identify P. fluorescens from lung biopsy specimens, providing insights into its pathogenic potential and informing treatment strategies based on antibiotic susceptibility testing.

Ongoing research into the antimicrobial resistance mechanisms of the Pseudomonas fluorescens complex is exploring both intrinsic and acquired resistance to antimicrobial agents in strains isolated from various environments. This research is crucial for understanding the evolution of antimicrobial resistance and the role of P. fluorescens as a potential reservoir of clinically important resistance genes.

Pseudomonas fluorescens is being studied for its biotechnological applications, particularly in the production of medium-chain-length polyhydroxyalkanoates (MCL-PHAs). These biodegradable polymers have potential uses in medical devices and drug delivery systems.

Pseudomonas fluorescens is an unusual cause of disease in humans, and usually affects patients with compromised immune systems (e.g., patients on cancer treatment). From 2004 to 2006, an outbreak of P. fluorescens in the United States involved 80 patients in six states. The source of the infection was contaminated heparinized saline flushes being used with cancer patients.

Pseudomonas fluorescens is also a known cause of fin rot in fish.

== Bioremediation properties ==
Pseudomonas fluorescens is increasingly recognized for its bioremediation potential, particularly in the degradation of environmental pollutants such as hydrocarbons. A study has shown that biostimulation and bioaugmentation with P. fluorescens can significantly contribute to the removal of total petroleum hydrocarbons (TPHs) from contaminated soil. This process is facilitated by the bacterium's production of biosurfactants, which increase the bioavailability of hydrocarbons for degradation.

Further research has explored the biofilm-forming and denitrification capabilities of Pseudomonas species, including P. fluorescens, in eutrophic waters. The ability to form biofilms and produce extracellular polymeric substances (EPS) enhances the bioremediation potential of these bacteria. Specifically, strains that exhibit strong biofilm-forming and EPS production capabilities show higher nitrate removing capacity, which is crucial for combating water pollution. These findings underscore the importance of Pseudomonas fluorescens in environmental cleanup efforts and its potential application in treating oil-contaminated and nutrient-poor soils as well as nitrate-polluted water.

== Agricultural Research ==
Pseudomonas fluorescens is increasingly recognized for its biocontrol properties in agriculture. Recent studies have demonstrated its effectiveness in controlling a variety of plant pathogens, including fungi, nematodes, and bacteria. The bacterium's ability to produce secondary metabolites, such as antibiotics and phytohormones, contributes to its biocontrol efficacy. These metabolites not only inhibit the growth of pathogens but also induce systemic resistance in plants, enhancing their natural defense mechanisms.

Moreover, the application of P. fluorescens as a biocontrol agent has been shown to be a sustainable alternative to chemical pesticides, promoting environmental health and reducing the ecological footprint of agricultural practices. The ongoing research in this field is focused on optimizing the use of P. fluorescens for biocontrol and understanding the underlying mechanisms that enable it to protect crops from diseases.

== Metabolism ==
Pseudomonas fluorescens produces phenazine, phenazine carboxylic acid, 2,4-diacetylphloroglucinol and the MRSA-active antibiotic mupirocin.

=== Biodegradation capacities ===
4-Hydroxyacetophenone monooxygenase is an enzyme found in P. fluorescens that transforms piceol, NADPH, H+, and O_{2} into 4-hydroxyphenyl acetate, NADP+, and H_{2}O.
