= 2,4-Diacetylphloroglucinol =

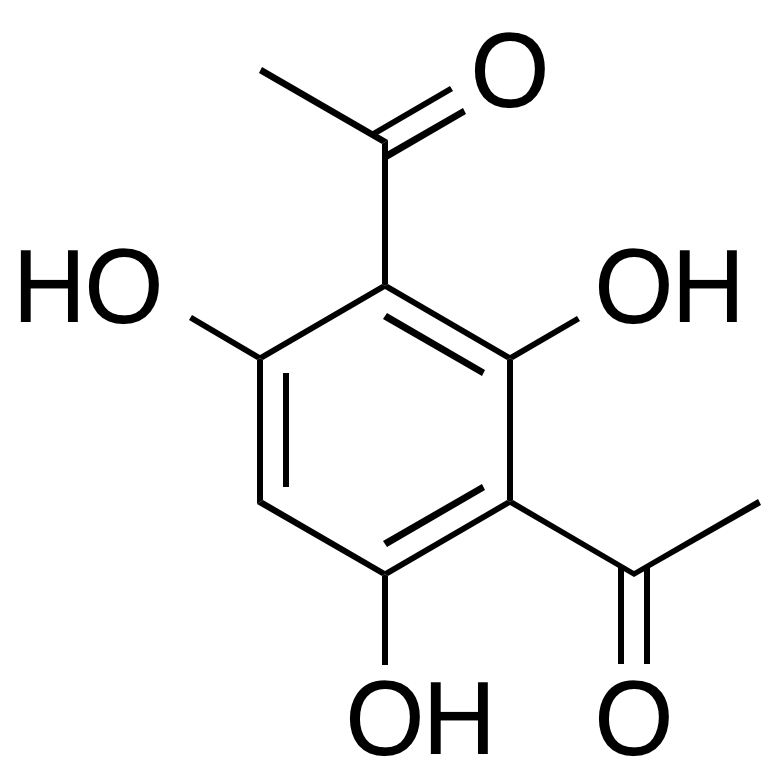
- Chemical structure of 2,4-diacetylphloroglucinol

Names
- Preferred IUPAC name 1,1′-(2,4,6-Trihydroxy-1,3-phenylene)di(ethan-1-one)
- Other names 1-(3-Acetyl-2,4,6-trihydroxyphenyl)ethanone; 2,4-DAPG

Identifiers
CAS Number	2161-86-6
3D model (JSmol)	Interactive image
ChEBI	CHEBI:78688
ChEMBL	ChEMBL276139
ChemSpider	15687
ECHA InfoCard	100.168.316
PubChem CID	16547
UNII	8XV4YYO3WN
CompTox Dashboard (EPA)	DTXSID10175995
- InChI: InChI=1S/C10H10O5/c1-4(11)8-6(13)3-7(14)9(5(2)12)10(8)15/h3,13-15H,1-2H3 Key: PIFFQYJYNWXNGE-UHFFFAOYSA-N
- SMILES: CC(=O)C1=C(C(=C(C=C1O)O)C(=O)C)O

Properties
Chemical formula	C_{10}H_{10}O_{5}
Molar mass	210.18 g/mol
- Except where otherwise noted, data are given for materials in their standard state (at 25 °C [77 °F], 100 kPa). verify (what is ?) Infobox references

2,4-Diacetylphloroglucinol or Phl is a natural phenol found in several bacteria:

- Specific strains of the Gram-negative bacterium Pseudomonas fluorescens. This compound is found to be responsible for the antiphytopathogenic and biocontrol properties in these strains.
- It is also found in Pseudomonas protegens, where it has the same activity against various plant pathogens.
- Lysobacter gummosus, a bacterium which lives on the skin of red-backed salamanders.
- Isolates of Pseudomonas aurantiaca found in Ukraine, living in root symbiosis produce it to control Fusarium oxysporum.
