= Pseudomonas chlororaphis =

Scientific classification
- Domain: Bacteria
- Kingdom: Pseudomonadati
- Phylum: Pseudomonadota
- Class: Gammaproteobacteria
- Order: Pseudomonadales
- Family: Pseudomonadaceae
- Genus: Pseudomonas
- Species: P. chlororaphis

Binomial name
- Pseudomonas chlororaphis (Guignard and Sauvageau 1894); Bergey, et al. 1930

Type strain
- ATCC 9446 CCUG 552 B CFBP 2132; CIP 63.22; DSM 50083; HAMBI 2011; JCM 2778; LMG 5004; NBRC 3904; NCCB 76041 and 37027; NCTC 13002; VKM B-1246

Synonyms
- Bacillus chlororaphis Guignard and Sauvageau 1894

Species of bacterium

Pseudomonas chlororaphis is a bacterium used as a soil inoculant in agriculture and horticulture. It can act as a biocontrol agent against certain fungal plant pathogens via production of phenazine-type antibiotics. Based on 16S rRNA analysis, similar species have been placed in its group.

A comparative genomic and phylogenomic study in 2020, analyzed 494 complete genomes from the entire Pseudomonas genus, with 43 of them being P. chlororaphis strains. In this study, the P. chlororaphis species was determined, based on its monophyly and criterion of Average Nucleotide Identity. This species lies within the wider P. fluorescens species complex, as determined by. The protein count and GC content of the strains of this species ranged between 5599 and 6401 (average: 6076) and between 61.9 and 64% (average: 62.8%), respectively. In addition, the 43 P. chlororaphis proteomes contained 3587 core proteins (shared among all strains of the species), with 11 core proteins being specific for that group and thus absent in all other strains of the Pseudomonas genus. Two of these 11 group-specific core proteins are a holin family bacteriocin and a mitomycin-like biosynthetic protein and they may confer a competitive advantage against other root-colonizers.

== The Pseudomonas chlororaphis group ==
Pseudomonas chlororaphis lends its name to a subgroup within the genus Pseudomonas. The other members of the P. chlororaphis subgroup are P. aurantiaca, P. aureofaciens, P. fragi, P. lundensis, and P. taetrolens.
