= Violacein =

Names
- IUPAC name (3E)-3-[5-(5-Hydroxy-1H-indol-3-yl)-2-oxo-1,2-dihydro-3H-pyrrol-3-ylidene]-1,3-dihydro-2H-indol-2-one
- Other names 3-(2-(5-Hydroxyindol-3-yl)-5-oxo-2-pyrrolin-4-ylidene)-2-indolinone

Identifiers
CAS Number	548-54-9
3D model (JSmol)	Interactive image
ChEBI	CHEBI:131914
ChEMBL	ChEMBL1652263
ChemSpider	8103672
KEGG	C21136
PubChem CID	11053
UNII	QJH0DSQ3SG
CompTox Dashboard (EPA)	DTXSID001028415
- InChI: InChI=1S/C20H13N3O3/c24-10-5-6-15-12(7-10)14(9-21-15)17-8-13(19(25)23-17)18-11-3-1-2-4-16(11)22-20(18)26/h1-9,21,23-25H Key: SHLJIZCPRXXHHZ-UHFFFAOYSA-N
- SMILES: C1=CC=C2C(=C1)/C(=C\3/C=C(NC3=O)C4=CNC5=C4C=C(C=C5)O)/C(=O)N2

Properties
Chemical formula	C_{20}H_{13}N_{3}O_{3}
Molar mass	343.342 g·mol^{−1}
- Except where otherwise noted, data are given for materials in their standard state (at 25 °C [77 °F], 100 kPa). verify (what is ?) Infobox references

Violacein is a naturally occurring bis-indole pigment with antibiotic (anti-bacterial, anti-viral, anti-fungal and anti-tumor) properties. Violacein is produced by several species of bacteria, including Chromobacterium violaceum, and gives these organisms their striking purple hues. Violacein shows increasing commercially interesting uses, especially for industrial applications in cosmetics, medicines and fabrics.

== Biosynthesis ==
Violacein is formed by enzymatic condensation of two tryptophan molecules, requiring the action of five proteins. The genes required for its production, vioABCDE, and the regulatory mechanisms employed haves been studied within a small number of violacein-producing strains. Production of violacein is controlled by quorum sensing using acyl-homoserine lactones (AHLs).

Only a few genera of bacteria have been reported to produce violacein. These include Chromobacterium, Duganella, Pseudoalteromonas, Janthinobacterium, Iodobacter, Rugamonas, and Massilia.

== Antibiotic activity ==
Violacein is known to have diverse biological activities, including as a cytotoxic anticancer agent and antibacterial action against Staphylococcus aureus and other gram-positive pathogens. Determining the biological roles of this pigmented molecule has been of particular interest to researchers, and understanding violacein's function and mechanism of action is relevant to potential applications. Commercial production of violacein and related compounds has proven difficult so improving fermentative yields of violacein is being pursued through genetic engineering and synthetic biology.
