= Acinetobacter calcoaceticus =

Scientific classification
- Domain: Bacteria
- Kingdom: Pseudomonadati
- Phylum: Pseudomonadota
- Class: Gammaproteobacteria
- Order: Pseudomonadales
- Family: Moraxellaceae
- Genus: Acinetobacter
- Species: A. calcoaceticus

Binomial name
- Acinetobacter calcoaceticus "Micrococcus calco-aceticus" Beijerinck 1911

Synonyms
- Neisseria winogradskyi Moraxella calcoacetica Micrococcus calcoaceticus Herellea vaginicola

Species of bacterium

Acinetobacter calcoaceticus is a bacterial species of the genus Acinetobacter. It is a nonmotile, Gram-negative coccobacillus. It grows under aerobic conditions, is catalase positive and oxidase negative. A. calcoaceticus is a part of the A. calcoaceticus–A. baumannii complex together with Acinetobacter baumannii, Acinetobacter nosocomialis, Acinetobacter pittii and Acinetobacter seifertii.

== Habitat ==
A. calcoaceticus is a soil bacterium. It has been shown to be in the human body's in moist areas like the mouth, groin, respiratory tract, and gastrointestinal tract. It is also present in Tiger mosquito (Aedes albopictus) microflora.

== Metabolism ==
Phloroglucinol carboxylic acid is a degradation product excreted by A. calcoaceticus grown on (+)-catechin as the sole source of carbon.

== Uses ==
A. calcoaceticus can be used as an alternative to A. baumannii in the laboratory setting. The interchangeability of the two species stems from their extreme degree of similarity and ability to form the A. calcoaceticus-A. baumannii complex.
