= Acinetobacter bouvetii =

Scientific classification
- Domain: Bacteria
- Kingdom: Pseudomonadati
- Phylum: Pseudomonadota
- Class: Gammaproteobacteria
- Order: Pseudomonadales
- Family: Moraxellaceae
- Genus: Acinetobacter
- Species: A. bouvetii

Binomial name
- Acinetobacter bouvetii Carr et al., 2003

Type strain
- 4B02T = DSM 14964T = CIP 107468T

Species of bacterium

Acinetobacter bouvetii is a gram-negative, strictly aerobic bacterium from the genus Acinetobacter which was isolated from activated sludge. Acinetobacter bouvetii is named after the French microbiologist Philippe Bouvet.
