= Paraperlucidibaca wandonensis =

Scientific classification
- Domain: Bacteria
- Kingdom: Pseudomonadati
- Phylum: Pseudomonadota
- Class: Gammaproteobacteria
- Order: Pseudomonadales
- Family: Moraxellaceae
- Genus: Paraperlucidibaca
- Species: P. wandonensis

Binomial name
- Paraperlucidibaca wandonensis Yoon et al. 2013

Type strain
- CCUG 63419, KCTC 32216, WT-RY4

Species of bacterium

Paraperlucidibaca wandonensis is a Gram-negative, strictly aerobic, catalase-negative, oxidase-positive, rod-shaped, nonmotile bacterium of the genus Paraperlucidibaca.
