= Acinetobacter larvae =

Scientific classification
- Domain: Bacteria
- Kingdom: Pseudomonadati
- Phylum: Pseudomonadota
- Class: Gammaproteobacteria
- Order: Pseudomonadales
- Family: Moraxellaceae
- Genus: Acinetobacter
- Species: A. larvae

Binomial name
- Acinetobacter larvae Liu et al. 2017

Type strain
- ACCC 19936, JCM 31367, BRTC-1

Species of bacterium

Acinetobacter larvae are a Gram-negative, aerobic, non-spore-forming, coccobacilli-shaped and non-motile bacterium from the genus of Acinetobacter which has been isolated from the gut of a larval from the insect Omphisa fuscidentalis.
