= Acinetobacter modestus =

Scientific classification
- Domain: Bacteria
- Kingdom: Pseudomonadati
- Phylum: Pseudomonadota
- Class: Gammaproteobacteria
- Order: Pseudomonadales
- Family: Moraxellaceae
- Genus: Acinetobacter
- Species: A. modestus

Binomial name
- Acinetobacter modestus Poppel et al., 2016

Type strain
- CCM 8639, CCUG 67964, CIP 110444, NIPH 236

Species of bacterium

Acinetobacter modestus is a species of gram-negative bacterium from the genus Acinetobacter.
