= Alkanindiges illinoisensis =

Scientific classification
- Domain: Bacteria
- Kingdom: Pseudomonadati
- Phylum: Pseudomonadota
- Class: Gammaproteobacteria
- Order: Pseudomonadales
- Family: Moraxellaceae
- Genus: Alkanindiges
- Species: A. illinoisensis

Binomial name
- Alkanindiges illinoisensis Bogan et al., 2003

Type strain
- ATCC PTA 4839, DSM 15370, GTI MVAB Hex1, MVAB Hex1

Species of bacterium

Alkanindiges illinoisensis is an aerobic, catalase-positive, squalane-degrading, non-spore-forming, nonmotile bacterium of the genus Alkanindiges, which was isolated from oilfield soils.
