= Acinetobacter qingfengensis =

Scientific classification
- Domain: Bacteria
- Kingdom: Pseudomonadati
- Phylum: Pseudomonadota
- Class: Gammaproteobacteria
- Order: Pseudomonadales
- Family: Moraxellaceae
- Genus: Acinetobacter
- Species: A. qingfengensis

Binomial name
- Acinetobacter qingfengensis Li et al. 2014

Type strain
- 2BJ-1, 2C-3-1, HF5-2, CFCC 10890, KCTC 32225

Species of bacterium

Acinetobacter qingfengensis is a Gram-negative, rod-shaped and non-motile bacterium from the genus Acinetobacter which has been isolated from the bark of the tree Populus x euramericana.
