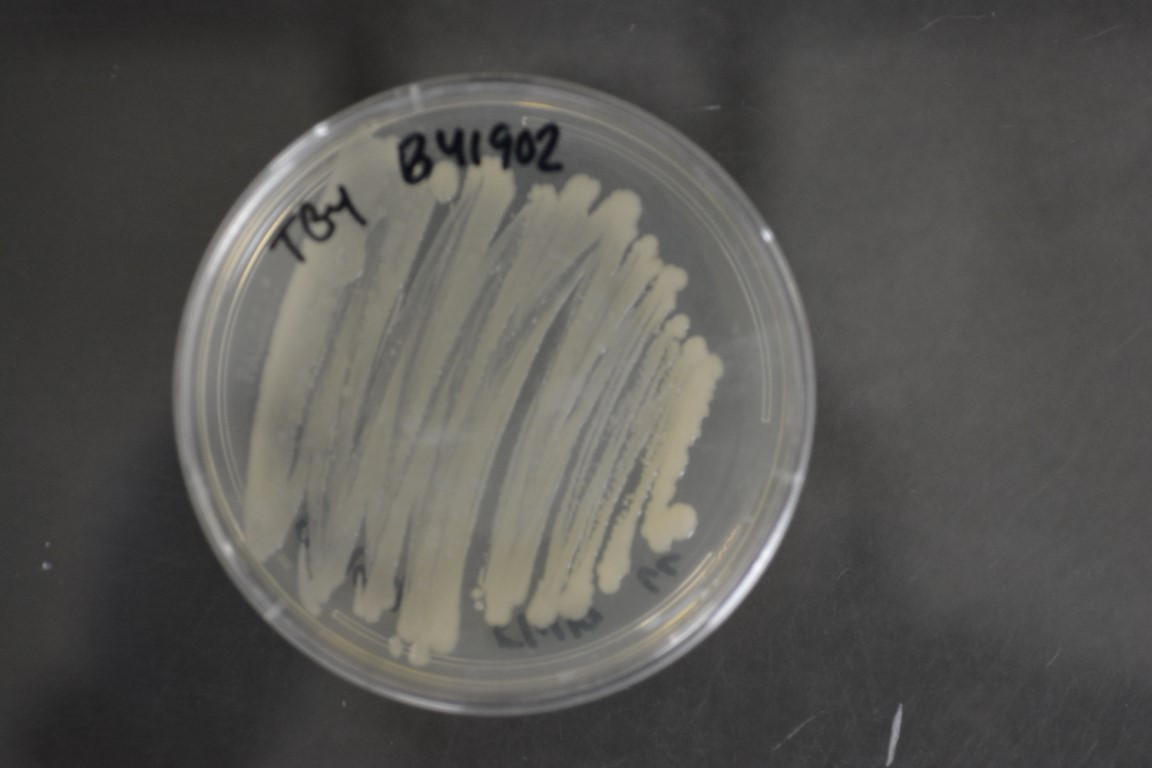

Scientific classification
- Domain: Bacteria
- Kingdom: Pseudomonadati
- Phylum: Pseudomonadota
- Class: Gammaproteobacteria
- Order: Pseudomonadales
- Family: Moraxellaceae
- Genus: Acinetobacter
- Species: A. lactucae

Binomial name
- Acinetobacter lactucae Rooney et al. 2016

Type strain
- NRRL B-41902, NRRL B-41903, NRRL B-41916, NRRL B-41918, CCUG 68785

= Acinetobacter lactucae =

Species of bacterium

Acinetobacter lactucae is a Gram-negative and strictly aerobic bacterium from the genus of Acinetobacter which has been isolated from the plant Lactuca sativa.
