= Acinetobacter vivianii =

Scientific classification
- Domain: Bacteria
- Kingdom: Pseudomonadati
- Phylum: Pseudomonadota
- Class: Gammaproteobacteria
- Order: Pseudomonadales
- Family: Moraxellaceae
- Genus: Acinetobacter
- Species: A. vivianii

Binomial name
- Acinetobacter vivianii Nemec et al. 2016

Type strain
- CCM 8642, CCUG 67967, CIP 110483, strain 1240, NIPH 2168

Species of bacterium

Acinetobacter vivianii is a bacterium from the genus of Acinetobacter. It was named after British Biologist Professor Alan Vivian.
