= Acinetobacter venetianus =

Scientific classification
- Domain: Bacteria
- Kingdom: Pseudomonadati
- Phylum: Pseudomonadota
- Class: Gammaproteobacteria
- Order: Pseudomonadales
- Family: Moraxellaceae
- Genus: Acinetobacter
- Species: A. venetianus

Binomial name
- Acinetobacter venetianus Di Cello et al., 1997

Species of bacterium

Acinetobacter venetianus is a species of bacteria notable for degrading n-alkanes. It harbours plasmids carrying sequences similar to the Pseudomonas oleovorans alkane hydroxylase gene alkBFGH. Its potential for bioremediation is an active research topic, particularly its role in the production of the bioemulsifier emulsan. Its type strain is RAG-1^{T}(=ATCC 31012^{T}=CCUG 45561^{T}=LMG 19082^{T}=LUH 3904^{T}=NIPH 1925^{T}).
