= Perlucidibaca piscinae =

Scientific classification
- Domain: Bacteria
- Kingdom: Pseudomonadati
- Phylum: Pseudomonadota
- Class: Gammaproteobacteria
- Order: Pseudomonadales
- Family: Moraxellaceae
- Genus: Perlucidibaca
- Species: P. piscinae

Binomial name
- Perlucidibaca piscinae Song et al. 2008

Type strain
- IMCC 1704, KCCM 42363, NBRC 102354

Species of bacterium

Perlucidibaca piscinae is a gram-negative, oxidase-positive and catalase-negative, facultatively aerobic, motile bacterium with a polar flagellum from the genus of Perlucidibaca which was isolated from an eutrophic pond.
