= Acinetobacter dijkshoorniae =

Scientific classification
- Domain: Bacteria
- Kingdom: Pseudomonadati
- Phylum: Pseudomonadota
- Class: Gammaproteobacteria
- Order: Pseudomonadales
- Family: Moraxellaceae
- Genus: Acinetobacter
- Species: A. dijkshoorniae

Binomial name
- Acinetobacter dijkshoorniae Cosgaya et al. 2016

Type strain
- NB14, JVAP01, LUH 08258, LUH 09464

Species of bacterium

Acinetobacter dijkshoorniae is a species of gram-negative bacterium from the genus of Acinetobacter.
