= Acinetobacter tjernbergiae =

Scientific classification
- Domain: Bacteria
- Kingdom: Pseudomonadati
- Phylum: Pseudomonadota
- Class: Gammaproteobacteria
- Order: Pseudomonadales
- Family: Moraxellaceae
- Genus: Acinetobacter
- Species: A. tjernbergiae

Binomial name
- Acinetobacter tjernbergiae Carr et al. 2003

Type strain
- 7N16, CCM 7200, CCUG 50768, CIP 107465, DSM 14971, KCTC 12418, R-18511

Species of bacterium

Acinetobacter tjernbergiae is a Gram-negative, strictly aerobic bacterium from the genus Acinetobacter isolated from a wastewater treatment plant.
