= Acinetobacter piscicola =

Scientific classification
- Domain: Bacteria
- Kingdom: Pseudomonadati
- Phylum: Pseudomonadota
- Class: Gammaproteobacteria
- Order: Pseudomonadales
- Family: Moraxellaceae
- Genus: Acinetobacter
- Species: A. piscicola

Binomial name
- Acinetobacter piscicola Liu et al. 2018

Type strain
- CICC 24241, JCM 32101, KCTC 62134, MCCC 1K03337, strain LW15

Species of bacterium

Acinetobacter piscicola is a Gram-negative, facultative anaerobic and non-motile bacterium from the genus of Acinetobacter which has been isolated from the fish Maccullochella peelii peelii.
