= Acinetobacter pragensis =

Scientific classification
- Domain: Bacteria
- Kingdom: Pseudomonadati
- Phylum: Pseudomonadota
- Class: Gammaproteobacteria
- Order: Pseudomonadales
- Family: Moraxellaceae
- Genus: Acinetobacter
- Species: A. pragensis

Binomial name
- Acinetobacter pragensis Radolfova-krizova et al. 2016

Type strain
- CCM 8637, CCUG 67962, CNCTC 7530, ANC 4149

Species of bacterium

Acinetobacter pragensis is a species of gram-negative bacterium from the genus of Acinetobacter which occurs in soil and water.
