= Acinetobacter bohemicus =

Scientific classification
- Domain: Bacteria
- Kingdom: Pseudomonadati
- Phylum: Pseudomonadota
- Class: Gammaproteobacteria
- Order: Pseudomonadales
- Family: Moraxellaceae
- Genus: Acinetobacter
- Species: A. bohemicus

Binomial name
- Acinetobacter bohemicus Krizova et al., 2015

Type strain
- ANC 4253, ANC 4278, CCM 8462, CCUG 63842, CIP 110496, ANC 3994

Species of bacterium

Acinetobacter bohemicus is species of gram-negativebacterium from the genus Acinetobacter which has been isolated from soil and water ecosystems in the Czech Republic.
