= Acinetobacter parvus =

Scientific classification
- Domain: Bacteria
- Kingdom: Pseudomonadati
- Phylum: Pseudomonadota
- Class: Gammaproteobacteria
- Order: Pseudomonadales
- Family: Moraxellaceae
- Genus: Acinetobacter
- Species: A. parvus

Binomial name
- Acinetobacter parvus Nemec et al. 2003

Type strain
- CCM 7030, CCUG 48800, CCUG 48866, CIP 108168, CNCTC 7336, DSM 16617, KCTC 12408, LMG 21765, LUH 4616, Nemec NIPH 384, NIPH 384, P.Jezek

Species of bacterium

Acinetobacter parvus is a Gram-negative, oxidase-negative, strictly aerobic bacterium from the genus Acinetobacter isolated from human clinical specimens.
