= Acinetobacter junii =

Scientific classification
- Domain: Bacteria
- Kingdom: Pseudomonadati
- Phylum: Pseudomonadota
- Class: Gammaproteobacteria
- Order: Pseudomonadales
- Family: Moraxellaceae
- Genus: Acinetobacter
- Species: A. junii

Binomial name
- Acinetobacter junii Bouvet & Grimont, 1986

Synonyms
- Acinetobacter grimontii

Species of bacterium

Acinetobacter junii is a species of bacteria. Its type strain is ATCC 17908. It can be pathogenic. This bacterium has been linked to nosocomial infections including catheter-related blood stream infections and cellulitis.
