= Acinetobacter harbinensis =

Scientific classification
- Domain: Bacteria
- Kingdom: Pseudomonadati
- Phylum: Pseudomonadota
- Class: Gammaproteobacteria
- Order: Pseudomonadales
- Family: Moraxellaceae
- Genus: Acinetobacter
- Species: A. harbinensis

Binomial name
- Acinetobacter harbinensis Li et al., 2014

Type strain
- CGMCC 1.12528, HITLi 7, KCTC 32411

Synonyms
- Acinetobacter nitrificans

Species of bacterium

Acinetobacter harbinensis is a gram-negative and strictly aerobic bacterium from the genus Acinetobacter which has been isolated from water of the Songhua River in Harbin in China.
