= Acinetobacter pakistanensis =

Scientific classification
- Domain: Bacteria
- Kingdom: Pseudomonadati
- Phylum: Pseudomonadota
- Class: Gammaproteobacteria
- Order: Pseudomonadales
- Family: Moraxellaceae
- Genus: Acinetobacter
- Species: A. pakistanensis

Binomial name
- Acinetobacter pakistanensis Abbas et al. 2015

Type strain
- NCCP-644, JCM 189775, KCTC 42081, LMG 28467

Species of bacterium

Acinetobacter pakistanensis is a Gram-negative, strictly aerobic, psychrotolerant, heavy metal-tolerant and non-motile bacterium from the genus Acinetobacter which has been isolated from a textile dyeing wastewater treatment pond in Islamabad in Pakistan.
