= Acinetobacter defluvii =

Scientific classification
- Domain: Bacteria
- Kingdom: Pseudomonadati
- Phylum: Pseudomonadota
- Class: Gammaproteobacteria
- Order: Pseudomonadales
- Family: Moraxellaceae
- Genus: Acinetobacter
- Species: A. defluvii

Binomial name
- Acinetobacter defluvii Hu et al., 2017

Type strain
- CCTCC AB 2016203, GDMCC 1.1101, KCTC 52503, WCHA30

Species of bacterium

Acinetobacter defluvii is a gram-negative and non-motile bacterium from the genus Acinetobacter which has been isolated from hospital sewage from the West China Hospital in China.
