= Acinetobacter radioresistens =

Scientific classification
- Domain: Bacteria
- Kingdom: Pseudomonadati
- Phylum: Pseudomonadota
- Class: Gammaproteobacteria
- Order: Pseudomonadales
- Family: Moraxellaceae
- Genus: Acinetobacter
- Species: A. radioresistens

Binomial name
- Acinetobacter radioresistens Nishimura et al. 1988

Species of bacterium

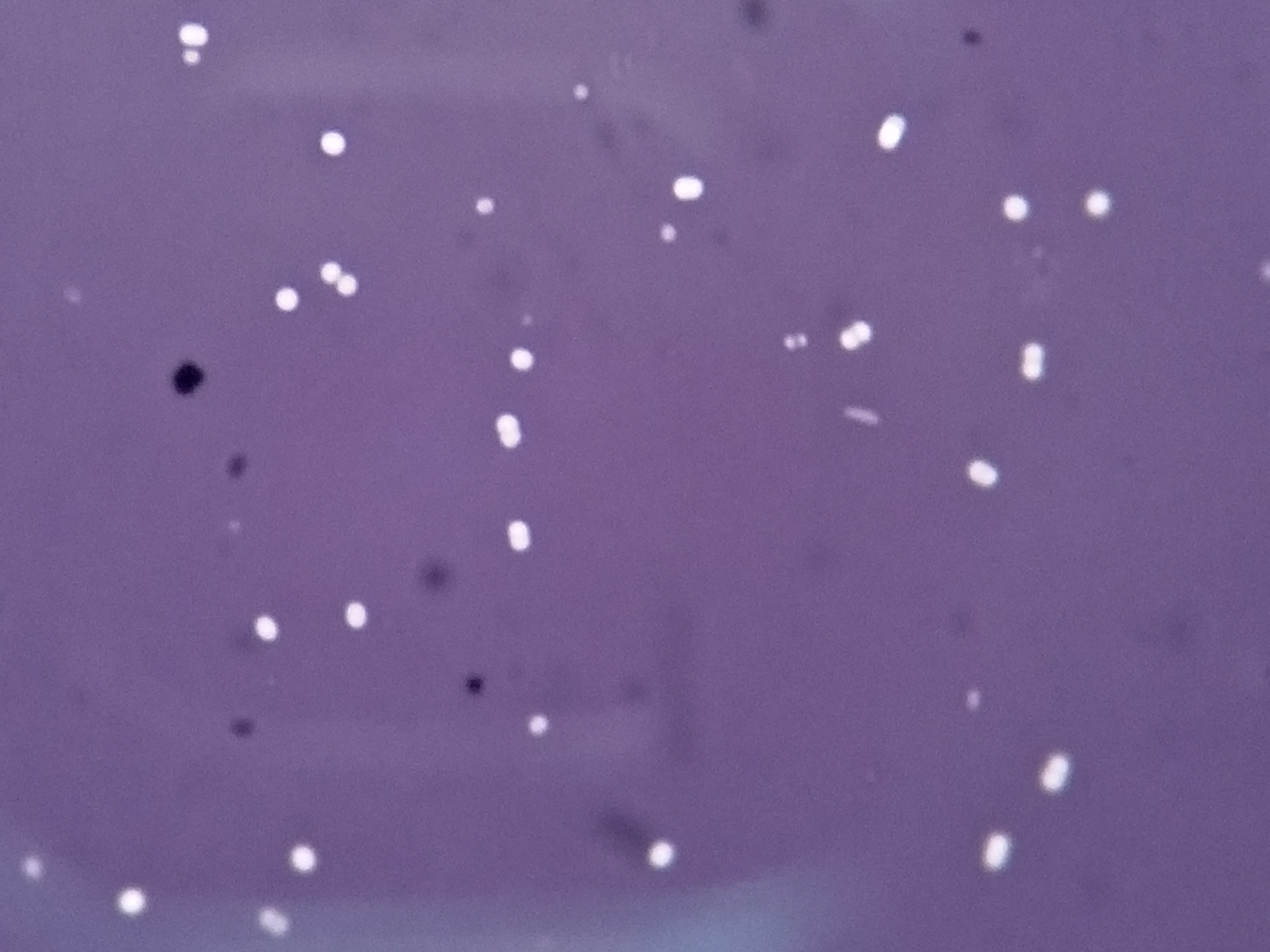

Acinetobacter radioresistens is a species of radiation-resistant bacteria. It is Gram-negative, oxidase-negative, not spore-forming, nonmotile, nonfermentative, aerobic, pleomorphic, and coccobacilli-shaped. The type strain of this species is strain FO-1 (= IAM 13186).

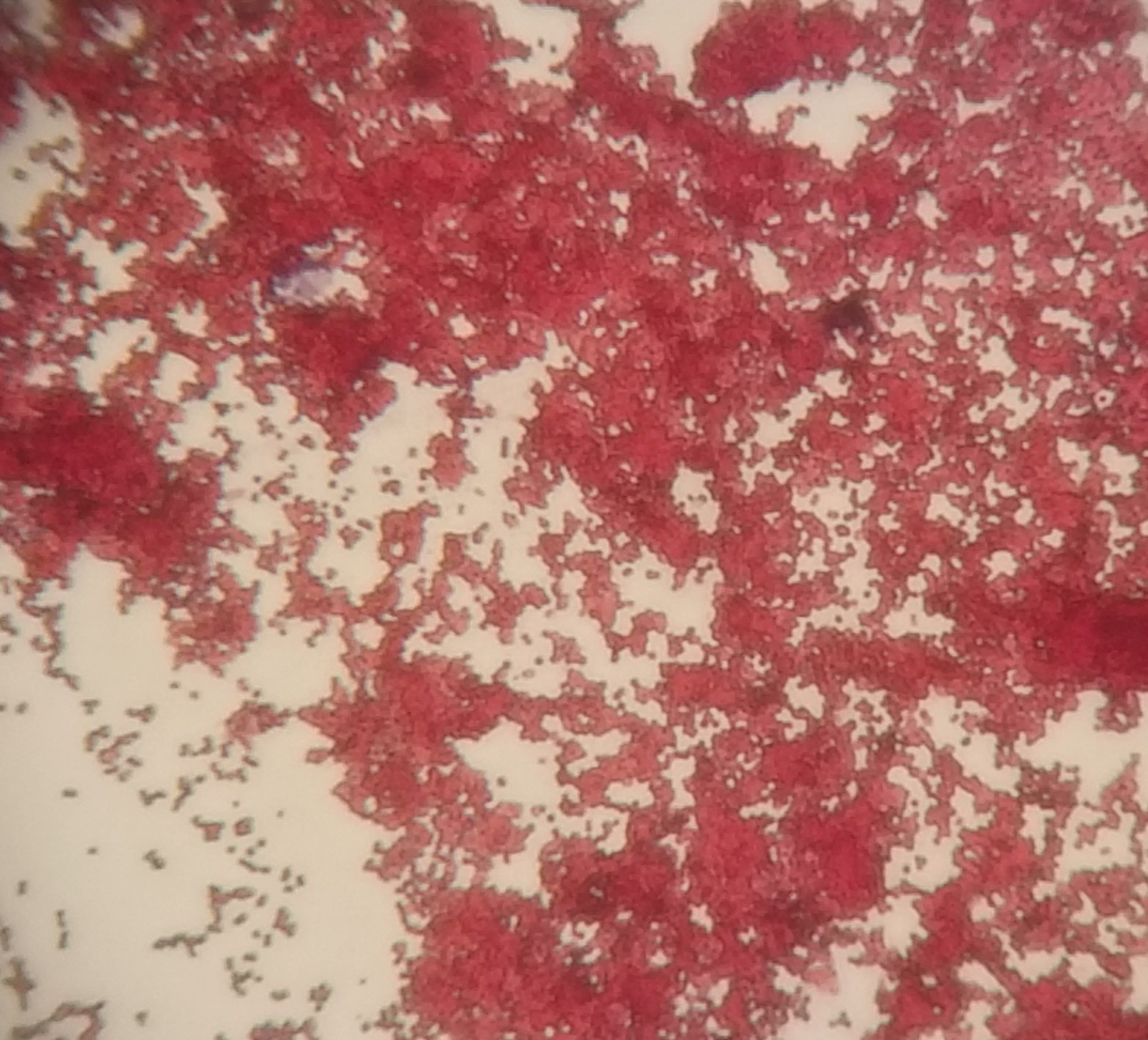
