= Acinetobacter beijerinckii =

Scientific classification
- Domain: Bacteria
- Kingdom: Pseudomonadati
- Phylum: Pseudomonadota
- Class: Gammaproteobacteria
- Order: Pseudomonadales
- Family: Moraxellaceae
- Genus: Acinetobacter
- Species: A. beijerinckii

Binomial name
- Acinetobacter beijerinckii Nemec et al. 2009

Type strain
- CCM 7266, CCUG 51249, LMG 25324, LUH 4759, NIPH 838, Tjernberg 58a

Species of bacterium

Acinetobacter beijerinckii is a gram-negative, strictly aerobic bacterium from the genus of Acinetobacter which was isolated from human and animal specimens and from different environmental sources.
