= Acinetobacter guangdongensis =

Scientific classification
- Domain: Bacteria
- Kingdom: Pseudomonadati
- Phylum: Pseudomonadota
- Class: Gammaproteobacteria
- Order: Pseudomonadales
- Family: Moraxellaceae
- Genus: Acinetobacter
- Species: A. guangdongensis

Binomial name
- Acinetobacter guangdongensis Feng et al., 2014

Type strain
- 1NM-4, CCTCC AB 2014199, GIMCC 1.656, KCTC 42012

Species of bacterium

Acinetobacter guangdongensis is a gram-negative and non-motile bacterium from the genus Acinetobacter which has been isolated from a lead-zinc ore mine in Mei County in Meizhou in China.
