= Acinetobacter bereziniae =

Scientific classification
- Domain: Bacteria
- Kingdom: Pseudomonadati
- Phylum: Pseudomonadota
- Class: Gammaproteobacteria
- Order: Pseudomonadales
- Family: Moraxellaceae
- Genus: Acinetobacter
- Species: A. bereziniae

Binomial name
- Acinetobacter bereziniae Nemec et al. 2010

Type strain
- ATCC 13702, ATCC 17924, BCRC 15423, Bouvet 69, Brisou 64, CCRC 15423, CCUG 26493, CDC KC724, CECT 442, CIP 70.12, Dijkshoorn 2224, Dijkshoorn serial no. 92, Hugh 2380, LMD 82.31, LMG 1003, LMG 10602, NCCB 82031, NCDC KC724, RH2380, NCIB 9019, NCIMB 9019, NIPH 521, RH 2380, RUH 2224, strain Brisou 64

Species of bacterium

Acinetobacter bereziniae is a gram-negative, strictly aerobic bacterium from the genus Acinetobacter.
