= Acinetobacter dispersus =

Scientific classification
- Domain: Bacteria
- Kingdom: Pseudomonadati
- Phylum: Pseudomonadota
- Class: Gammaproteobacteria
- Order: Pseudomonadales
- Family: Moraxellaceae
- Genus: Acinetobacter
- Species: A. dispersus

Binomial name
- Acinetobacter dispersus Nemec et al. 2016

Type strain
- 17BJ, CCM 8636, CCUG 67961, CIP 110500, ANC 4105

Species of bacterium

Acinetobacter dispersus is a species of gram-negative bacteria from the genus of Acinetobacter.
