= Acinetobacter puyangensis =

Scientific classification
- Domain: Bacteria
- Kingdom: Pseudomonadati
- Phylum: Pseudomonadota
- Class: Gammaproteobacteria
- Order: Pseudomonadales
- Family: Moraxellaceae
- Genus: Acinetobacter
- Species: A. puyangensis

Binomial name
- Acinetobacter puyangensis Li et al. 2013

Type strain
- BQ4-1, NHI3-2, CFCC 10780, JCM 18011

Species of bacterium

Acinetobacter puyangensis is a Gram-negative, rod-shaped and non-motile bacterium from the genus Acinetobacter which has been isolated from the bark of the tree Populus x euramericana.
