= Acinetobacter portensis =

Scientific classification
- Domain: Bacteria
- Kingdom: Pseudomonadati
- Phylum: Pseudomonadota
- Class: Gammaproteobacteria
- Order: Pseudomonadales
- Family: Moraxellaceae
- Genus: Acinetobacter
- Species: A. portensis

Binomial name
- Acinetobacter portensis Carvalheira et al. 2020

Type strain
- AC 877

Species of bacteria

Acinetobacter portensis is a species of Gram-negative bacteria of the genus Acinetobacter described in 2020. The description was based on the characterization of four strains, isolated from raw beef, chicken, pork and turkey meat, collected from supermarkets in Porto, Portugal, in 2014. The type strain of the species is available at the Culture Collection University of Gothenburg (CCUG) and the Czech Collection of Microorganisms (CCM), under the deposit numbers CCUG 68672^{T} and CCM 8789^{T}, respectively. The draft genome sequence of the type strain is deposited in DNA Data Bank of Japan, European Nucleotide Archive and GenBank under the accession number LWRV00000000.
