= Acinetobacter gyllenbergii =

Scientific classification
- Domain: Bacteria
- Kingdom: Pseudomonadati
- Phylum: Pseudomonadota
- Class: Gammaproteobacteria
- Order: Pseudomonadales
- Family: Moraxellaceae
- Genus: Acinetobacter
- Species: A. gyllenbergii

Binomial name
- Acinetobacter gyllenbergii Nemec et al., 2009

Type strain
- CCM 7267, CCUG 51248, LMG 25325, NIPH 2150, RUH 422, strain 1271

Species of bacterium

Acinetobacter gyllenbergii is a gram-negative, oxidase-negative, catalase-positive, strictly aerobic nonmotile bacterium from the genus Acinetobacter isolated from human clinical specimens. It is named in honour of Finnish bacteriologist and taxonomist Helge G. Gyllenberg.
