= Acinetobacter cumulans =

Scientific classification
- Domain: Bacteria
- Kingdom: Pseudomonadati
- Phylum: Pseudomonadota
- Class: Gammaproteobacteria
- Order: Pseudomonadales
- Family: Moraxellaceae
- Genus: Acinetobacter
- Species: A. cumulans

Binomial name
- Acinetobacter cumulans Qin et al. 2019

Type strain
- WCHAc060092

Species of bacterium

Acinetobacter cumulans is a bacterium from the genus of Acinetobacter which has been isolated from hospital sewage from China. Acinetobacter cumulans is resistant against clinically important antibiotics.
