= Acinetobacter indicus =

Scientific classification
- Domain: Bacteria
- Kingdom: Pseudomonadati
- Phylum: Pseudomonadota
- Class: Gammaproteobacteria
- Order: Pseudomonadales
- Family: Moraxellaceae
- Genus: Acinetobacter
- Species: A. indicus

Binomial name
- Acinetobacter indicus Malhotra et al., 2012

Type strain
- A648, CCM 7832, DSM 25388

Species of bacterium

Acinetobacter indicus is a gram-negative, oxidase-negative, catalase-positive, strictly aerobic nonmotile bacterium from the genus Acinetobacter isolated from a hexachlorocyclohexane dump site in Ummari near Lucknow in India.
