= Acinetobacter variabilis =

Scientific classification
- Domain: Bacteria
- Kingdom: Pseudomonadati
- Phylum: Pseudomonadota
- Class: Gammaproteobacteria
- Order: Pseudomonadales
- Family: Moraxellaceae
- Genus: Acinetobacter
- Species: A. variabilis

Binomial name
- Acinetobacter variabilis Krizova et al. 2015

Type strain
- CCM 8555, CCUG 26390, CIP 110486, NIPH 2171

Species of bacterium

Acinetobacter variabilis is a bacterium from the genus Acinetobacter which has been isolated from human urine in Malmö in Sweden.
