= Alkanindiges hongkongensis =

Scientific classification
- Domain: Bacteria
- Kingdom: Pseudomonadati
- Phylum: Pseudomonadota
- Class: Gammaproteobacteria
- Order: Pseudomonadales
- Family: Moraxellaceae
- Genus: Alkanindiges
- Species: A. hongkongensis

Binomial name
- Alkanindiges hongkongensis Woo et al. 2016

Type strain
- DSM 17557

Synonyms
- Pseudacinetobacter hongkongensis; Pseudoacinetobacter hongkongensis

Species of bacterium

Alkanindiges hongkongensis is a gram-negative, aerobic, nonmotile bacterium of the genus Alkanindiges, which was isolated from the parotid abscess of a patient.
