= Acinetobacter populi =

Scientific classification
- Domain: Bacteria
- Kingdom: Pseudomonadati
- Phylum: Pseudomonadota
- Class: Gammaproteobacteria
- Order: Pseudomonadales
- Family: Moraxellaceae
- Genus: Acinetobacter
- Species: A. populi

Binomial name
- Acinetobacter populi Li et al. 2015

Type strain
- 05d10-3-4, 07d10-4-10, 16D10-4-5, PBJ7, PBJ7T, PZ2

Species of bacterium

Acinetobacter populi is a species of gram-negative bacterium from the genus of Acinetobacter which has been isolated from a canker of the tree Populus x euramericana in Puyang in China.
