= Acinetobacter apis =

Scientific classification
- Domain: Bacteria
- Kingdom: Pseudomonadati
- Phylum: Pseudomonadota
- Class: Gammaproteobacteria
- Order: Pseudomonadales
- Family: Moraxellaceae
- Genus: Acinetobacter
- Species: A. apis

Binomial name
- Acinetobacter apis Kim et al., 2014

Type strain
- HYN18, JCM 18575, KACC 16906

Species of bacterium

Acinetobacter apis is a gram-negative, obligate aerobic and non-motile bacterium from the genus Acinetobacter which has been isolated from the intestinal tract of the bee Apis mellifera. A. apis showed optimum growth at 25 degrees Celsius, pH 6–7, and in the presence of 1% (w/v) NaCl in trypticase soy broth medium. This bacterium was first characterized in 2014.
