= Acinetobacter boissieri =

Scientific classification
- Domain: Bacteria
- Kingdom: Pseudomonadati
- Phylum: Pseudomonadota
- Class: Gammaproteobacteria
- Order: Pseudomonadales
- Family: Moraxellaceae
- Genus: Acinetobacter
- Species: A. boissieri

Binomial name
- Acinetobacter boissieri Álvarez-Pérez et al. 2013

Type strain
- CECT 8128, LMG 26959, SAP 284.1

Species of bacterium

Acinetobacter boissieri is a gram-negative, oxidase-negative, catalase-positive, strictly aerobic nonmotile bacterium from the genus Acinetobacter which was isolated from plants' floral nectar pollinated by wild Mediterranean insects. Acinetobacter boissieri is named after botanist Pierre Edmond Boissier.
