= Acinetobacter gerneri =

Scientific classification
- Domain: Bacteria
- Kingdom: Pseudomonadati
- Phylum: Pseudomonadota
- Class: Gammaproteobacteria
- Order: Pseudomonadales
- Family: Moraxellaceae
- Genus: Acinetobacter
- Species: A. gerneri

Binomial name
- Acinetobacter gerneri Carr et al. 2003

Species of bacterium

Acinetobacter gerneri is a Gram-negative, strictly aerobic bacterium from the genus Acinetobacter which was isolated from activated sludge.
