= Acinetobacter rudis =

Scientific classification
- Domain: Bacteria
- Kingdom: Pseudomonadati
- Phylum: Pseudomonadota
- Class: Gammaproteobacteria
- Order: Pseudomonadales
- Family: Moraxellaceae
- Genus: Acinetobacter
- Species: A. rudis

Binomial name
- Acinetobacter rudis Vaz-Moreira et al. 2011

Type strain
- CCUG 57889, CECT 7818, DSM 24031, G30, LMG 26107

Species of bacterium

Acinetobacter rudis is a Gram-negative, strictly aerobic bacterium from the genus Acinetobacter isolated from raw milk and wastewater.
