= Acinetobacter kookii =

Scientific classification
- Domain: Bacteria
- Kingdom: Pseudomonadati
- Phylum: Pseudomonadota
- Class: Gammaproteobacteria
- Order: Pseudomonadales
- Family: Moraxellaceae
- Genus: Acinetobacter
- Species: A. kookii

Binomial name
- Acinetobacter kookii Choi et al., 2013

Type strain
- 11-0202, 11-0607, JCM 18512, KCTC 32033

Species of bacterium

Acinetobacter kookii is a gram-negative bacterium from the genus Acinetobacter which has been isolated from soil from Jeonju in Korea.
