= Acinetobacter celticus =

Scientific classification
- Domain: Bacteria
- Kingdom: Pseudomonadati
- Phylum: Pseudomonadota
- Class: Gammaproteobacteria
- Order: Pseudomonadales
- Family: Moraxellaceae
- Genus: Acinetobacter
- Species: A. celticus

Binomial name
- Acinetobacter celticus Radolfova-Krizova et al., 2016

Type strain
- CCM 8700, CCUG 69239, CNCTC 7549, ANC 4603

Species of bacteria

Acinetobacter celticus is a psychrotolerant bacterium from the genus of Acinetobacter which occurs in soil and water.
