= Acinetobacter brisouii =

Scientific classification
- Domain: Bacteria
- Kingdom: Pseudomonadati
- Phylum: Pseudomonadota
- Class: Gammaproteobacteria
- Order: Pseudomonadales
- Family: Moraxellaceae
- Genus: Acinetobacter
- Species: A. brisouii

Binomial name
- Acinetobacter brisouii Anandham et al., 2011

Species of bacterium

Acinetobacter brisouii is a gram-negative, strictly aerobic, non-spore-forming, nonmotile bacterium from the genus Acinetobacter isolated from a peat layer on Yongneup in South Korea.
