= Perlucidibaca aquatica =

Scientific classification
- Domain: Bacteria
- Kingdom: Pseudomonadati
- Phylum: Pseudomonadota
- Class: Gammaproteobacteria
- Order: Pseudomonadales
- Family: Moraxellaceae
- Genus: Perlucidibaca
- Species: P. aquatica

Binomial name
- Perlucidibaca aquatica Baek et al. 2017

Type strain
- JCM 31377, KCTC 52162, BK296, BK30

Species of bacterium

Perlucidibaca aquatica is a gram-negative, strictly aerobic, rod-shaped and non-motile bacterium from the genus of Perlucidibaca which has been isolated from water from a limestone cave from Samcheok in Korea.
