= Acinetobacter gandensis =

Scientific classification
- Domain: Bacteria
- Kingdom: Pseudomonadati
- Phylum: Pseudomonadota
- Class: Gammaproteobacteria
- Order: Pseudomonadales
- Family: Moraxellaceae
- Genus: Acinetobacter
- Species: A. gandensis

Binomial name
- Acinetobacter gandensis Smet et al. 2014

Type strain
- ANC 4275, ANC 4319, ANC 4320

Species of bacterium

Acinetobacter gandensis is a species of gram-negative bacterium from the genus Acinetobacter which has been isolated from horse and cattle dung in Merelbeke in Belgium.
