= Acinetobacter pseudolwoffii =

Scientific classification
- Domain: Bacteria
- Kingdom: Pseudomonadati
- Phylum: Pseudomonadota
- Class: Gammaproteobacteria
- Order: Pseudomonadales
- Family: Moraxellaceae
- Genus: Acinetobacter
- Species: A. pseudolwoffii

Binomial name
- Acinetobacter pseudolwoffii Nemec et al. 2019

Type strain
- ANC 5044

Species of bacterium

Acinetobacter pseudolwoffii is a bacterium from the genus of Acinetobacter which has been isolated from water with sediments from a forest creek.
