= Acinetobacter ursingii =

Scientific classification
- Domain: Bacteria
- Kingdom: Pseudomonadati
- Phylum: Pseudomonadota
- Class: Gammaproteobacteria
- Order: Pseudomonadales
- Family: Moraxellaceae
- Genus: Acinetobacter
- Species: A. ursingii

Binomial name
- Acinetobacter ursingii Nemec et al. 2001

Species of bacterium

Acinetobacter ursingii is a species of potentially pathogenic bacteria. Its type strain is LUH 3792^{T} (= NIPH 137^{T} = LMG 19575^{T} = CNCTC 6735^{T}).
