= Acinetobacter guerrae =

Scientific classification
- Domain: Bacteria
- Kingdom: Pseudomonadati
- Phylum: Pseudomonadota
- Class: Gammaproteobacteria
- Order: Pseudomonadales
- Family: Moraxellaceae
- Genus: Acinetobacter
- Species: A. guerrae

Binomial name
- Acinetobacter guerrae Carvalheira et al. 2020

Type strain
- AC 1271

Species of bacteria

Acinetobacter guerrae is a species of Gram-negative bacteria of the genus Acinetobacter that was described in 2020. The species was described based on the characterization of two strains, isolated from raw chicken meat, in Porto, Portugal. Additionally, two publicly available draft genome sequences were also identified as members of A. guerrae, one of them isolated from human sputum in Kanagawa, Japan, and one isolated from hospital sewage in Sichuan, China. The draft genome sequence of the type strain is deposited in DNA Data Bank of Japan, European Nucleotide Archive, and GenBank under the accession number LXGN00000000
