= Acinetobacter albensis =

Scientific classification
- Domain: Bacteria
- Kingdom: Pseudomonadati
- Phylum: Pseudomonadota
- Class: Gammaproteobacteria
- Order: Pseudomonadales
- Family: Moraxellaceae
- Genus: Acinetobacter
- Species: A. albensis

Binomial name
- Acinetobacter albensis Krizova et al., 2015

Type strain
- CCM 8611, CCUG 67281, ANC 4874

Species of bacterium

Acinetobacter albensis is a species of gram-negative bacterium from the genus of Acinetobacter which has been isolated from water and soil of the Czech Republic.
