= Acinetobacter soli =

Scientific classification
- Domain: Bacteria
- Kingdom: Pseudomonadati
- Phylum: Pseudomonadota
- Class: Gammaproteobacteria
- Order: Pseudomonadales
- Family: Moraxellaceae
- Genus: Acinetobacter
- Species: A. soli

Binomial name
- Acinetobacter soli Kim et al. 2009

Type strain
- C. N. Seong B1, JCM 15062, KCTC 22184

Species of bacterium

Acinetobacter soli is a Gram-negative, catalase-positive, oxidase-negative, strictly aerobic rod-shaped, nonmotile bacterium from the genus Acinetobacter isolated from forest soil at Mt. Baekwoon in the Republic of Korea. . Acinetobacter soli can cause bloodstream infection in neonates.
