= Acinetobacter colistiniresistens =

Scientific classification
- Domain: Bacteria
- Kingdom: Pseudomonadati
- Phylum: Pseudomonadota
- Class: Gammaproteobacteria
- Order: Pseudomonadales
- Family: Moraxellaceae
- Genus: Acinetobacter
- Species: A. colistiniresistens

Binomial name
- Acinetobacter colistiniresistens Nemec et al., 2017

Species of bacterium

Acinetobacter colistiniresistens is a bacterium from the genus of Acinetobacter which has been isolated from human infections. Cells of Acinetobacter colistinresistens are gram-negative.
