= Acinetobacter tandoii =

Scientific classification
- Domain: Bacteria
- Kingdom: Pseudomonadati
- Phylum: Pseudomonadota
- Class: Gammaproteobacteria
- Order: Pseudomonadales
- Family: Moraxellaceae
- Genus: Acinetobacter
- Species: A. tandoii

Binomial name
- Acinetobacter tandoii Carr et al. 2003

Type strain
- 4N13, CCM 7199, CIP 107469, DSM 14970, KCTC 12417, R-18507

Species of bacterium

Acinetobacter tandoii is a Gram-negative, strictly aerobic bacterium from the genus Acinetobacter isolated from activated sludge.
