= Acinetobacter lanii =

Scientific classification
- Domain: Bacteria
- Kingdom: Pseudomonadati
- Phylum: Pseudomonadota
- Class: Gammaproteobacteria
- Order: Pseudomonadales
- Family: Moraxellaceae
- Genus: Acinetobacter
- Species: A. lanii

Binomial name
- Acinetobacter lanii Zhu et al. 2021

Type strain
- CGMCC 1.13636

Species of bacterium

Acinetobacter lanii is a Gram-negative, non-haemolytic and non-motile bacterium from the genus of Acinetobacter which has been isolated from the faeces of a Kiang from the Tibetan Plateau.
