= Acinetobacter courvalinii =

Scientific classification
- Domain: Bacteria
- Kingdom: Pseudomonadati
- Phylum: Pseudomonadota
- Class: Gammaproteobacteria
- Order: Pseudomonadales
- Family: Moraxellaceae
- Genus: Acinetobacter
- Species: A. courvalinii

Binomial name
- Acinetobacter courvalinii Nemec et al., 2016

Type strain
- 14BJ, CCM 8635, CCUG 67960, CIP 110480, ANC 3623

Species of bacterium

Acinetobacter courvalinii is a bacterium from the genus of Acinetobacter. Cells of A. courvalinii are gram-negative.
