= Acinetobacter equi =

Scientific classification
- Domain: Bacteria
- Kingdom: Pseudomonadati
- Phylum: Pseudomonadota
- Class: Gammaproteobacteria
- Order: Pseudomonadales
- Family: Moraxellaceae
- Genus: Acinetobacter
- Species: A. equi

Binomial name
- Acinetobacter equi Poppel et al. 2016

Type strain
- CCUG 65204, DSM 27228, strain 114

Species of bacterium

Acinetobacter equi is a Gram-negative, rod-shaped and obligate aerobic bacterium from the genus of Acinetobacter which has been isolated from horse faeces.
