= Acinetobacter haemolyticus =

Scientific classification
- Domain: Bacteria
- Kingdom: Pseudomonadati
- Phylum: Pseudomonadota
- Class: Gammaproteobacteria
- Order: Pseudomonadales
- Family: Moraxellaceae
- Genus: Acinetobacter
- Species: A. haemolyticus

Binomial name
- Acinetobacter haemolyticus Bouvet & Grimont, 1986

Species of bacterium

Acinetobacter haemolyticus is a species of bacterium. Its type strain is ATCC 17906. It is potentially pathogenic.

Acinetobacter haemolyticus can be used as a promising microorganism for Cr(VI) reduction from industrial waste waters.

Acinetobacter haemolyticus or ZYL is a new aerobic denitrifying bacterium. The strain could use nitrate, nitrite and ammonium as the sole N-source for growth with a final product of N2, demonstrating its good abilities for aerobic denitrification and heterotrophic nitrification.
