= Acinetobacter oryzae =

Scientific classification
- Domain: Bacteria
- Kingdom: Pseudomonadati
- Phylum: Pseudomonadota
- Class: Gammaproteobacteria
- Order: Pseudomonadales
- Family: Moraxellaceae
- Genus: Acinetobacter
- Species: A. oryzae

Binomial name
- Acinetobacter oryzae Chaudhary et al. 2012

Type strain
- B23

Species of bacterium

Acinetobacter oryzae is a species of gram-negative bacterium from the genus of Acinetobacter which has been isolated from a rice plant (Oryza alta).
