= Paraperlucidibaca baekdonensis =

Scientific classification
- Domain: Bacteria
- Kingdom: Pseudomonadati
- Phylum: Pseudomonadota
- Class: Gammaproteobacteria
- Order: Pseudomonadales
- Family: Moraxellaceae
- Genus: Paraperlucidibaca
- Species: P. baekdonensis

Binomial name
- Paraperlucidibaca baekdonensis Oh et al. 2011, sp. nov

Type strain
- CCUG 59307, KCTC 23145, RL-2

Synonyms
- Moraxellaceae bacterium RL-2

Species of bacterium

Paraperlucidibaca baekdonensis is a Gram-negative, strictly aerobic, catalase-negative, oxidase-positive, rod-shaped, nonmotile bacterium of the genus Paraperlucidibaca, which was isolated from seawater of Baekdo Harbor in the Sea of Japan.
