= Acinetobacter schindleri =

Scientific classification
- Domain: Bacteria
- Kingdom: Pseudomonadati
- Phylum: Pseudomonadota
- Class: Gammaproteobacteria
- Order: Pseudomonadales
- Family: Moraxellaceae
- Genus: Acinetobacter
- Species: A. schindleri

Binomial name
- Acinetobacter schindleri Nemec et al. 2001

Species of bacterium

Acinetobacter schindleri is a species of bacteria. It is potentially pathogenic. Its type strain is LUH 5832^{T} (= NIPH 1034^{T} = LMG 19576^{T} = CNCTC 6736^{T}).
