= Acinetobacter towneri =

Scientific classification
- Domain: Bacteria
- Kingdom: Pseudomonadati
- Phylum: Pseudomonadota
- Class: Gammaproteobacteria
- Order: Pseudomonadales
- Family: Moraxellaceae
- Genus: Acinetobacter
- Species: A. towneri

Binomial name
- Acinetobacter towneri Carr et al. 2003

Type strain
- AB1110, CCM 7201, CCUG 50769, CIP 107472, DSM 14962, KCTC 12419, P. Kämpfer AB1110, R-18505

Species of bacterium

Acinetobacter towneri is a Gram-negative, strictly aerobic bacterium from the genus Acinetobacter isolated from activated sludge in Bendigo in Australia.
