= Acinetobacter guillouiae =

Scientific classification
- Domain: Bacteria
- Kingdom: Pseudomonadati
- Phylum: Pseudomonadota
- Class: Gammaproteobacteria
- Order: Pseudomonadales
- Family: Moraxellaceae
- Genus: Acinetobacter
- Species: A. guillouiae

Binomial name
- Acinetobacter guillouiae Nemec et al., 2010,

Type strain
- ATCC 11171, Baumann 94, BCRC 15424, Bouvet 73, CCRC 15424, CCT 1870, CCUG 2491, CIP 63.46, Dijkshoorn 2861, DSM 590, Evans Vibrio 01, LMD 80.2, LMG 10604, LMG 988, NCCB 80002, NCIB 8250, NCIM 2886, NCIMB 8250, NIPH 522, VTT E-981118

Species of bacterium

Acinetobacter guillouiae is a gram-negative, strictly aerobic bacterium from the genus Acinetobacter isolated from gasworks effluent.
