= Acinetobacter nectaris =

Scientific classification
- Domain: Bacteria
- Kingdom: Pseudomonadati
- Phylum: Pseudomonadota
- Class: Gammaproteobacteria
- Order: Pseudomonadales
- Family: Moraxellaceae
- Genus: Acinetobacter
- Species: A. nectaris

Binomial name
- Acinetobacter nectaris Álvarez-Pérez et al., 2013

Type strain
- CECT 8127, LMG 26958, SAP 763.2

Species of bacterium

Acinetobacter nectaris is a gram-negative, oxidase-negative, catalase-positive, strictly aerobic nonmotile bacterium from the genus Acinetobacter isolated from floral nectar pollinated by Mediterranean insects in the Doñana National Park in the Huelva Province in Spain. Bacterial communities, including microbes identified as A. nectaris are closely associated with plant communities; other strains of bacteria (Gluconoacetobacter, Erwinia and Rhizobium) have been found in environments that mother bees visit. This bacterium was first characterized in 2013.
