= Acinetobacter chengduensis =

Scientific classification
- Domain: Bacteria
- Kingdom: Pseudomonadati
- Phylum: Pseudomonadota
- Class: Gammaproteobacteria
- Order: Pseudomonadales
- Family: Moraxellaceae
- Genus: Acinetobacter
- Species: A. chengduensis

Binomial name
- Acinetobacter chengduensis Qin et al. 2020

Type strain
- WCHAc060005

Species of bacterium

Acinetobacter chengduensis is a Gram-negative, obligate aerobic and non-motile bacterium from the genus of Acinetobacter which has been isolated from hospital sewage from China.
