= CIF =

CIF, c.i.f. or Cif may refer to:

== Finance ==
- Climate Investment Funds, in international climate change agreements
- Community Infrastructure Fund (CIF), a method of UK government funding for transport infrastructure
- Cost, Insurance and Freight, (c.i.f.) a historic trade term and International Commercial Term (Incoterm) indicating that a price includes cost, insurance and freight
- Código de identificación fiscal, a former Spanish tax identification number for legal entities; See Identity document

== Organizations ==
- California Interscholastic Federation, the governing body for high school sports in California
  - CIF Central Section
  - CIF Central Coast Section
  - CIF Los Angeles City Section
  - CIF North Coast Section
  - CIF Northern Section
  - CIF Oakland Section
  - CIF Sac-Joaquin Section
  - CIF San Diego Section
  - CIF San Francisco Section
  - CIF Southern Section
- Canada India Foundation, a Canadian lobbying organization
- China International Fund, a Chinese company that funds large-scale national projects in developing countries

== Science and technology ==
- Caltech Intermediate Form, geometry language for VLSI design, in which the primitives are coloured rectangles (similar to GDSII)
- Catch-in Focus, a function offered by SLR cameras to release the shutter automatically when the subject comes into focus
- Central Instrumentation Facility, a former building at the Kennedy Space Center that housed data processing machines
- CFTR inhibitory factor (Cif), a virulence factor secreted by Pseudomonas aeruginosa
- Common Intermediate Format, a video format common in video teleconferencing
- Crystallographic Information File, a standard text file format

== Other uses ==
- Counter Insurgency Force, a Police tactical unit of West Bengal Police
- Cif, a brand of household cleaning products by Unilever
- Cif., the standard author abbreviation for Raffaele Ciferri
- Champions Indoor Football, a professional indoor American football league
- Chifeng Yulong Airport (IATA code), China
- Coming into force, the process of legislation becoming effective
- Comment is free (Cif), online comment section of The Guardian newspaper

== See also ==
- Common Internet File System (CIFS), in computer networking
