= Halopseudomonas =

Scientific classification
- Domain: Bacteria
- Kingdom: Pseudomonadati
- Phylum: Pseudomonadota
- Class: Gammaproteobacteria
- Order: Pseudomonadales
- Family: Pseudomonadaceae
- Genus: Halopseudomonas; Rudra and Gupta 2021

Species
- See text.

Synonyms
- the Pseudomonas pertucinogena group; Neopseudomonas Saati-Santamaría et al. 2021

Genus of bacteria

Halopseudomonas is a genus of pseudomonad bacteria.

== Species ==
The genus Halopseudomonas comprises the following species:

- Halopseudomonas aestusnigri (Sánchez et al. 2014) Rudra and Gupta 2021
- Halopseudomonas bauzanensis (Zhang et al. 2011) Rudra and Gupta 2021
- Halopseudomonas formosensis (Lin et al. 2013) Rudra and Gupta 2021
- Halopseudomonas gallaeciensis (Mulet et al. 2018) Rudra and Gupta 2021
- Halopseudomonas litoralis (Pascual et al. 2012) Rudra and Gupta 2021
- Halopseudomonas oceani (Wang and Sun 2016) Rudra and Gupta 2021
- Halopseudomonas pachastrellae (Romanenko et al. 2005) Rudra and Gupta 2021
- Halopseudomonas pelagia (Hwang et al. 2009) Rudra and Gupta 2021
- Halopseudomonas pertucinogena (Kawai and Yabuuchi 1975) Rudra and Gupta 2021
- Halopseudomonas sabulinigri (Kim et al. 2009) Rudra and Gupta 2021
- Halopseudomonas salegens (Amoozegar et al. 2014) Rudra and Gupta 2021
- Halopseudomonas salina (Zhong et al. 2015) Rudra and Gupta 2021
- Halopseudomonas xiamenensis (Lai and Shao 2008) Rudra and Gupta 2021
- Halopseudomonas xinjiangensis (Liu et al. 2009) Rudra and Gupta 2021

The following species belong to Halopseudomonas but have not formally been transferred, yet:

- Pseudomonas abyssi Wei et al. 2018
- "Pseudomonas jilinensis" Wang et al. 2020
- "Pseudomonas laoshanensis" Wang et al. 2021
- "Pseudomonas nanhaiensis" Pang et al. 2021
- Pseudomonas neustonica Jang et al. 2020
- Pseudomonas phragmitis Li et al. 2020
- Pseudomonas populi Anwar et al. 2016
- Pseudomonas profundi Sun et al. 2018
- Pseudomonas saliphila Zhang et al. 2021
- "Pseudomonas saudimassiliensis" Azhar et al. 2017
- "Pseudomonas yangmingensis" Wong and Lee 2014
