= Perlucidibaca =

Scientific classification
- Domain: Bacteria
- Kingdom: Pseudomonadati
- Phylum: Pseudomonadota
- Class: Gammaproteobacteria
- Order: Pseudomonadales
- Family: Moraxellaceae
- Genus: Perlucidibaca; Song et al. 2008

Type species
- Perlucidibaca piscinae

Species
- P. aquatica P. piscinae

Genus of bacteria

Perlucidibaca is a genus of gram-negative, oxidase-positive and catalase-negative, motile bacteria with a polar flagellum, which belong to the class Gammaproteobacteria.
