= Alkanindiges =

Scientific classification
- Domain: Bacteria
- Kingdom: Pseudomonadati
- Phylum: Pseudomonadota
- Class: Gammaproteobacteria
- Order: Pseudomonadales
- Family: Moraxellaceae
- Genus: Alkanindiges; Bogan et al., 2003

Type species
- Alkanindiges illinoisensis

Species
- Alkanindiges hongkongensis Alkanindiges illinoisensis

Genus of bacteria

Alkanindiges is a genus of gram-negative alkane-degrading bacteria which belong to the class Gammaproteobacteria and which occurs in activated sludge systems.
