= Sara Branham Matthews =

American microbiologist (1888–1962)

Sara Elizabeth Branham Matthews
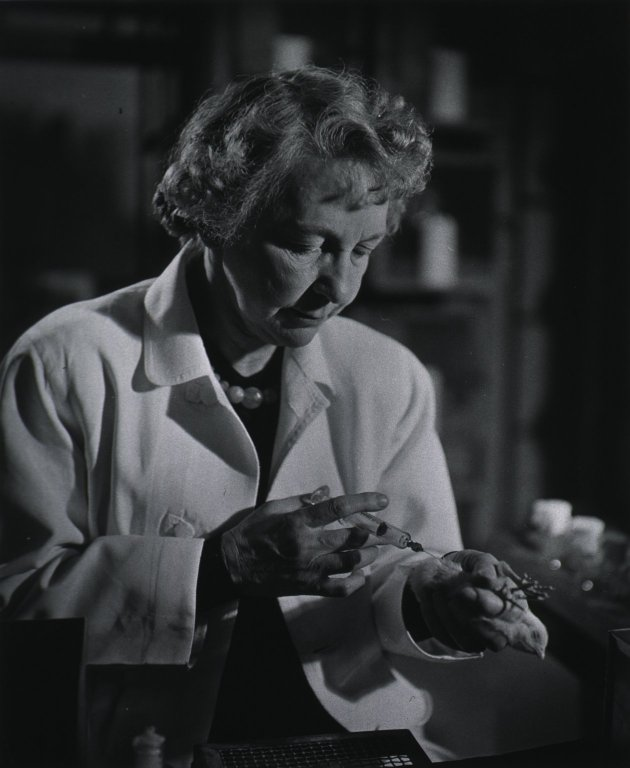
- Injecting a chick,1955
- Born: November 16, 1888; Oxford, Georgia, United States
- Died: November 16, 1962 (aged 74); Oxford, Georgia
- Resting place: Oxford Historical cemetery
- Education: University of Colorado Boulder
- Spouse: Phillips S. Matthews
- Awards: Howard Taylor Ricketts (1924)
- Scientific career
- Fields: Microbiology

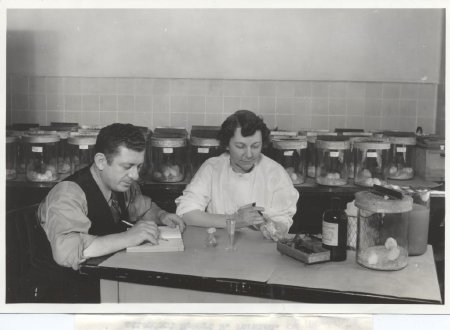
Sara Branham inoculating antiserum into a mouse to determine whether it would protect against meningitis, Robert Forkish assisting, 1937

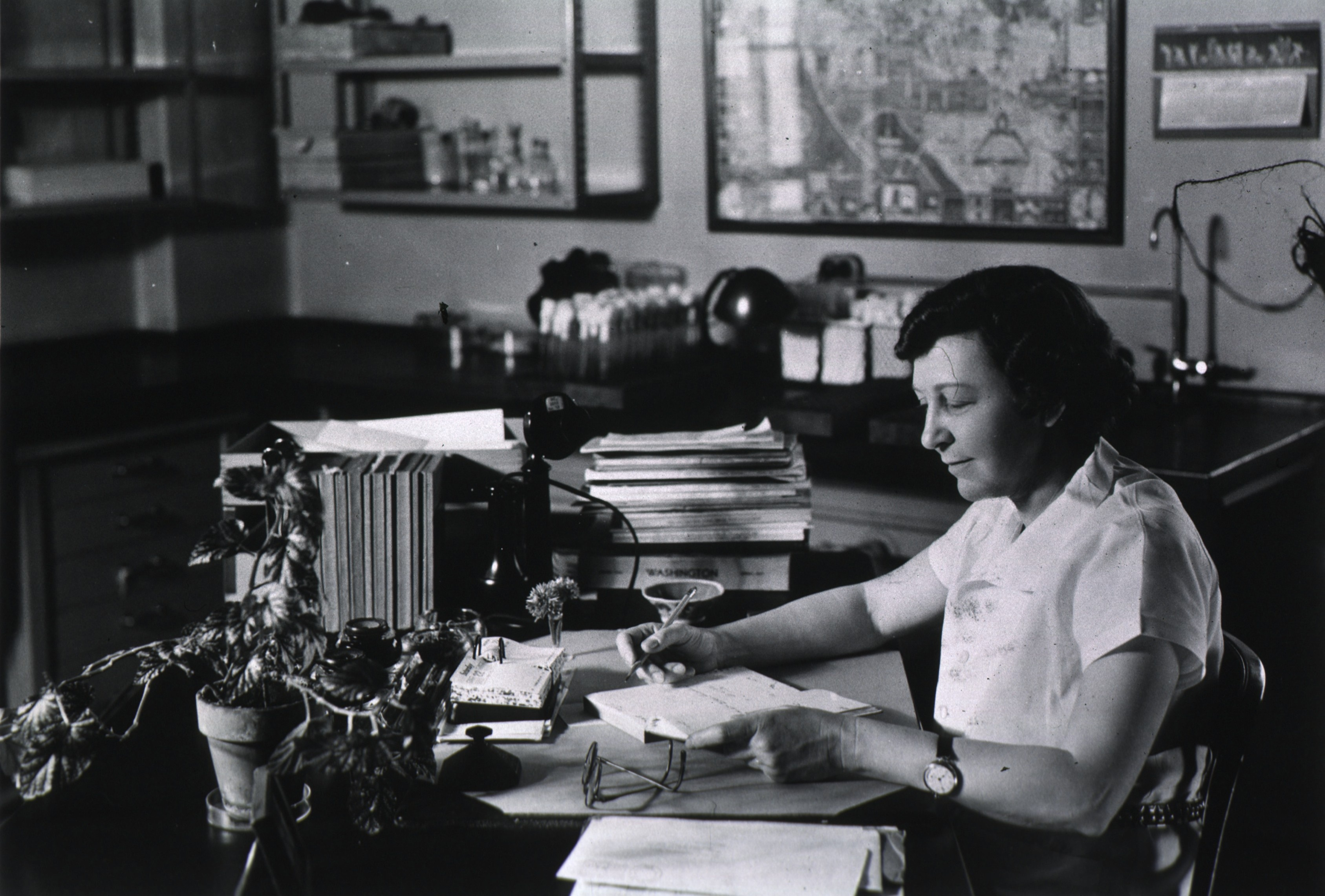
Sara Branham summarizing report on a "mouse protection test," ca 1938

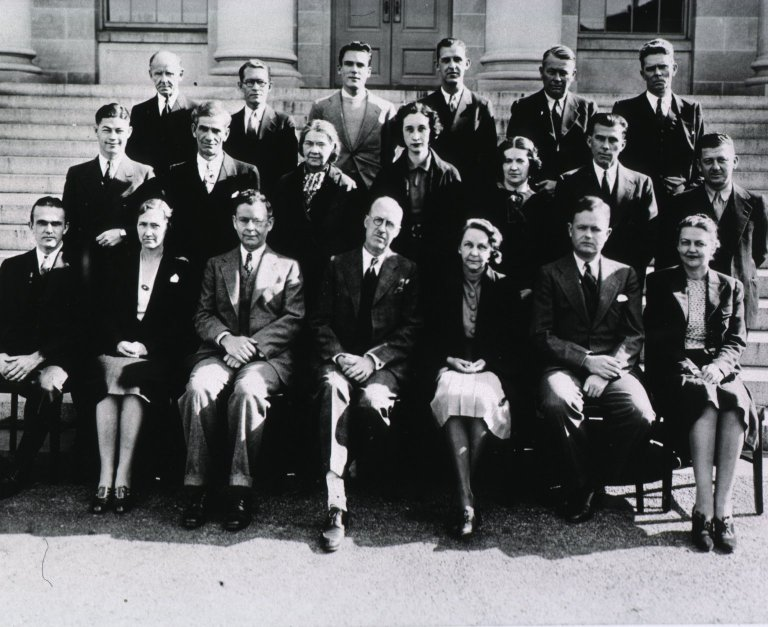
NIH Division of Biologics Control, with Sara Branham, 1938

Sara Elizabeth Branham Matthews (1888–1962) was an American microbiologist and physician best known for her research into the isolation and treatment of Neisseria meningitidis, a causative organism of meningitis.

== Biography ==
Branham was born July 25, 1888, in Oxford, Georgia to mother Sarah ("Sallie") Stone and father Junius Branham. Although education of women was not commonplace at the time, members of Sara Branham's family were firm believers in the value of education for women. Following in the footsteps of her mother (Amanda Stone Branham, 1885 graduate) and grandmother (Elizabeth Flournoy Stone, 1840 graduate), she attended Wesleyan College in Macon, Georgia and graduated with a Bachelor of Science degree in biology in 1907 as a third generation alumna. She was a member of Alpha Delta Pi. With few professional opportunities offered to women with an education then, she became a schoolteacher, working for ten years in Georgia's public school system in Sparta, Decatur, and finally at Atlanta's Girls' High School. In the summer of 1917, she began taking classes at the University of Colorado Boulder to expand her education, but within a few weeks, she was hired by the University of Colorado Boulder in 1917 as a bacteriology teacher, since there was a shortage of men from the department during World War I. She remarked on the change of roles: "When I had had about six weeks of bacteriology, they offered me a job to teach it!" She completed a second Bachelor of Science degree at the university in 1919, majoring in chemistry and zoology, and stated that "When the war was over, I was too deep in bacteriology to ever get out again."

After finishing her degree in Colorado in 1919, she went to Chicago during the influenza pandemic of 1918-1919 with a desire to enter the field of medical research. She enrolled at the University of Chicago where she would eventually complete, all with honors, a Master in Science degree, a Doctor of Philosophy degree in bacteriology, and a Doctor of Medicine degree. Her advisor at the university suggested that she study the etiology of influenza for her thesis. Therefore, in pursuit of her degrees at the University of Chicago, she studied filterable agents (viruses), and published over a dozen papers on the topic. This work eventually earned Branham a position as instructor in the Department of Hygiene and Bacteriology.

In 1927, Branham left Chicago and began working as an associate at the University of Rochester School of Medicine under Stanhope Bayne-Jones. Shortly thereafter, the outbreak of meningococcus arrived in California from China. Because of this, Branham's career shifted paths, and she began working for what is now the National Institutes of Health (NIH) (then, known as the Hygienic Laboratory of the United States Public Health Service) in Bethesda, Maryland as a senior bacteriologist, in order to study meningococcus. Branham stayed at the NIH for the rest of her career. She remained in the role for over 25 years until she was promoted to the Chief of Bacterial Toxins of the Division of Biological Standards in 1955.

Branham married retired businessman Philip S. Matthews in 1945. Matthews died four years later. Branham retired from the NIH in 1958 at the age of seventy from the position of Chief of the Section on Bacterial Toxins, and died November 16, 1962 after a sudden heart attack. She is buried in Oxford, Georgia in her family's plot.

Broadly, Sara Branham's research was based in the field of infectious diseases, including influenza, salmonella, shigella, diphtheria, dysentery, and psittacosis. She studied the toxins produced by Shigella dysenteriae. The main focus of Branham's work at the National Institutes of Health, however, was meningitis. This focus was Branham responding to what was quickly becoming a health crisis: an untreatable form of meningitis had arrived in the United States and began spreading quickly. She is credited with the discovery and isolation of Neisseria meningitidis. Neisseria is a common causative organism of meningitis, and its taxonomy is well characterized by Branham throughout her work. She also discovered that the infection could be treated with sulfa drugs rather than antiserums that were used at the time, but that were ineffective in treating these bacteria. Branham was considered an international expert on the neisseriae: in 1970, years after her death, Neisseria catarrhalis was renamed Branhamella catarrhalis to commemorate Branham's great contributions after differences were found between that species and other members of genus Neisseria. The new name was officially accepted in the 1974 edition of Bergey's Manual of Systematic Bacteriology, but more recently, Branhamella has been considered to be a subgenus of Moraxella that contains M. catarrhalis and other bacteria with spherical morphology.

Branham's studies in infectious disease were nationally known, and she came to be considered as one of the "grand ladies of microbiology". In a biographical article about Branham published in the Atlanta Constitution, the huge impact of her work was summarized in the exclamation: "She killed millions of killers!"

Alongside her busy professional life, Sara Branham played an active role in the community. She is regarded as a very influential woman that inspired those who worked with her throughout her career. She gave back to her alma mater by being an active alumna and supporter, returning for reunions and serving as alumna trustee from 1936 to 1939. She was a featured speaker for several events and gave many lectures, including two in 1960 just a couple years before she died. She was also active in many scientific societies. She contributed to what is now the American Society for Microbiology (then, known as the Society of American Bacteriologists). She was a delegate at the First and Second International Congresses in Microbiology in 1930 (Paris) and 1936 (London). She served as a diplomat on both the American Board of Pathology in the field of Clinical Microbiology and the National Board of Medical Examiners. One of Branham's colleagues remarked that Branham was equally comfortable entertaining in a chiffon dress and in a lab coat. She was known to be meticulous about her home and lawn, and was an avid ornithologist and gardener.

== Awards and honors ==
Branham was awarded the Howard Taylor Ricketts Prize in 1924 from the University of Chicago. Wesleyan College's Alumnae Association began recognizing the distinguished achievement of their individual alumnae in 1950. In the inaugural year, Branham was honored with Wesleyan College's first Distinguished Service Award in 1950. She later received a similar award from the University of Chicago Medical School Alumni Association. She was also awarded an honorary doctor of science from the University of Colorado, which would be the last of six total degrees she earned in her life. In 1959, she was honored as the American Medical Women's Association's Medical Woman of the Year. In a similar fashion as the honor from Wesleyan, Branham was honored in Georgia Women of Achievement's first class of inductees in 1992.

Over the course of her career, she published eighty papers and helped with the composition of many textbooks. Her papers are held at the National Library of Medicine.
