= Denitrificimonas caeni =

Scientific classification
- Domain: Bacteria
- Kingdom: Pseudomonadati
- Phylum: Pseudomonadota
- Class: Gammaproteobacteria
- Order: Pseudomonadales
- Family: Pseudomonadaceae
- Genus: Denitrificimonas; Saati-Santamaría et al. 2021
- Species: D. caeni

Binomial name
- Denitrificimonas caeni (Xiao et al. 2009) Saati-Santamaría et al. 2021

Type strain
- CCTCC AB208156 CECT 7778; DSM 24390; HY-14; KCTC 22292

Synonyms
- Pseudomonas caeni Xiao et al. 2009; Thiopseudomonas caeni (Xiao et al. 2009) Rudra and Gupta 2021

Species of bacteria

Denitrificimonas caeni is a genus of pseudomonad bacteria.
