= Proteolyticus =

Proteolyticus may refer to:

- Acinetobacter proteolyticus, species of bacteria
- Coprothermobacter proteolyticus, species of bacteria
- Psychrobacter proteolyticus, species of bacteria
