= Faucicola =

Scientific classification
- Domain: Bacteria
- Kingdom: Pseudomonadati
- Phylum: Pseudomonadota
- Class: Gammaproteobacteria
- Order: Pseudomonadales
- Family: Moraxellaceae
- Genus: Faucicola; Humphreys et al. 2015

Species
- F. mancuniensis

Genus of bacteria

Faucicola is a genus of bacteria which belongs to the class Gammaproteobacteria with one known species (Faucicola mancuniensis). Faucicola mancuniensis has been isolated from a human oropharynx.
