= Acinetobacter seifertii =

Scientific classification
- Domain: Bacteria
- Kingdom: Pseudomonadati
- Phylum: Pseudomonadota
- Class: Gammaproteobacteria
- Order: Pseudomonadales
- Family: Moraxellaceae
- Genus: Acinetobacter
- Species: A. seifertii

Binomial name
- Acinetobacter seifertii Nemec et al. 2015

Type strain
- LLK-2014, LUH 1471, LUH 1472

Species of bacterium

Acinetobacter seifertii is bacterium from the genus Acinetobacter which has been isolated from human clinical specimens.
