= Acinetobacter pittii =

Scientific classification
- Domain: Bacteria
- Kingdom: Pseudomonadati
- Phylum: Pseudomonadota
- Class: Gammaproteobacteria
- Order: Pseudomonadales
- Family: Moraxellaceae
- Genus: Acinetobacter
- Species: A. pittii

Binomial name
- Acinetobacter pittii Nemec et al. 2011

Type strain
- ATCC 19004, Bouvet and Grimont 25, CIP 70.29, Courtieu 57.071.228, Dijkshoorn serial no. 55, Hugh 2425, LMG 1035, LMG 10565, NCDC KC739, NIPH 519, RUH 2206, strain 320, WDCM 00072

Species of bacterium

Acinetobacter pittii is a Gram-negative, oxidase-negative, catalase-positive, strictly aerobic, nonmotile, diplococcoid rod bacterium from the genus Acinetobacter. DNA-DNA hybridization studies have been used to identify DNA groups (genomic species) within the genus Acinetobacter and A. pittii belongs to the Acinetobacter calcoaceticus-baumannii complex. The specific epithet pittii is named after the British microbiologist Tyrone Pitt.

Bacteria of the genus Acinetobacter are ubiquitously distributed in nature. They are found in various types of soils and waters and are occasionally found in foodstocks. They are normal inhabitants of human skin and are capable of transitory colonization of the upper respiratory tract. They can cause infection in debilitated patients.
