= Paraperlucidibaca =

Scientific classification
- Domain: Bacteria
- Kingdom: Pseudomonadati
- Phylum: Pseudomonadota
- Class: Gammaproteobacteria
- Order: Pseudomonadales
- Family: Moraxellaceae
- Genus: Paraperlucidibaca; Oh et al. 2011

Type species
- Paraperlucidibaca baekdonensis

Species
- Paraperlucidibaca baekdonensis Paraperlucidibaca wandonensis

Genus of bacteria

Paraperlucidibaca is a genus of Gram-negative, non-spore-forming, rod-shaped bacteria which belongs to the class Gammaproteobacteria.
