= Halopseudomonas pachastrellae =

Scientific classification
- Domain: Bacteria
- Kingdom: Pseudomonadati
- Phylum: Pseudomonadota
- Class: Gammaproteobacteria
- Order: Pseudomonadales
- Family: Pseudomonadaceae
- Genus: Halopseudomonas
- Species: H. pachastrellae

Binomial name
- Halopseudomonas pachastrellae (Romanenko et al. 2005) Rudra and Gupta 2021

Synonyms
- Neopseudomonas pachastrellae (Romanenko et al. 2005) Saati-Santamaría et al. 2021; Pseudomonas pachastrellae Romanenko et al. 2005

Species of bacterium

Halopseudomonas pachastrellae is a Gram-negative bacterium found in deep-sea sponges. The type strain is JCM 12285.
