= Cavicella =

Paraperlucidibaca

Scientific classification
- Domain: Bacteria
- Kingdom: Pseudomonadati
- Phylum: Pseudomonadota
- Class: Gammaproteobacteria
- Order: Pseudomonadales
- Family: Moraxellaceae
- Genus: Cavicella; França et al. 2015

Species
- C. subterranea

Genus of bacteria

Cavicella is a genus of bacteria which belongs to the class Gammaproteobacteria with one known species (Cavicella subterranea). Cavicella subterranea has been isolated from mineral water from a 150-metre-deep borehole in Portugal.

Cavicella’s temperature range is mesophilic, growing best at moderate temperatures, between 25°C and 40°C. Cavicella specifically, grows best at 28°C.
