= Acinetobacter proteolyticus =

Scientific classification
- Domain: Bacteria
- Kingdom: Pseudomonadati
- Phylum: Pseudomonadota
- Class: Gammaproteobacteria
- Order: Pseudomonadales
- Family: Moraxellaceae
- Genus: Acinetobacter
- Species: A. proteolyticus

Binomial name
- Acinetobacter proteolyticus Nemec et al. 2016

Type strain
- CCM 8640, CCUG 67965, CIP 110482, strain 631, NIPH 809

Species of bacterium

Acinetobacter proteolyticus is a species of gram-negative bacterium from the genus of Acinetobacter.
