= Halopseudomonas pertucinogena =

Scientific classification
- Domain: Bacteria
- Kingdom: Pseudomonadati
- Phylum: Pseudomonadota
- Class: Gammaproteobacteria
- Order: Pseudomonadales
- Family: Pseudomonadaceae
- Genus: Halopseudomonas
- Species: H. pertucinogena

Binomial name
- Halopseudomonas pertucinogena (Kawai and Yabuuchi 1975) Rudra and Gupta 2021

Type strain
- ATCC 190 CCUG 7832; CIP 106696; JCM 11590; LMG 1874; NBRC 14163

Synonyms
- Pseudomonas pertucinogena Kawai and Yabuuchi 1975 (Approved Lists 1980); Neopseudomonas pertucinogena (Kawai and Yabuuchi 1975) Saati-Santamaría et al. 2021

Species of bacterium

Halopseudomonas pertucinogena is a Gram-negative, rod-shaped, motile bacterium. It derives its name from the fact that it produces pertucin, a bacteriocin active against phase I organisms of Bordetella pertussis. H. pertucinogena was originally assigned to the genus Pseudomonas, but was later assigned to Halopseudomonas.
