= Fluviicoccus =

Scientific classification
- Domain: Bacteria
- Kingdom: Pseudomonadati
- Phylum: Pseudomonadota
- Class: Gammaproteobacteria
- Order: Pseudomonadales
- Family: Moraxellaceae
- Genus: Fluviicoccus; Kim et al. 2016

Species
- F. keumensis

Genus of bacteria

Fluviicoccus is a genus of bacteria which belongs to the class Gammaproteobacteria with one known species (Fluviicoccus keumensis). Fluviicoccus keumensis has been isolated from freshwater.
