= Branhamella =

Scientific classification
- Domain: Bacteria
- Kingdom: Pseudomonadati
- Phylum: Pseudomonadota
- Class: Gammaproteobacteria
- Order: Pseudomonadales
- Family: Moraxellaceae
- Genus: Branhamella; Catlin 1970

Type species
- Moraxella catarrhalis(Branhamella catarrhalis)

Species
- Branhamella catarrhalis

Genus of bacteria

The only species of Branhamella (Branhamella catarrhalis) is reclassified to Moraxella catarrhalis.
