= Gamma-150 RNA motif =

RNA Structure

The gamma-150 RNA motif is a conserved RNA structure that is found in bacteria within the order Pseudomonadales. Because gamma-150 RNAs are not consistently in 5' UTRs, the gamma-150 motif is presumed to correspond to a non-coding RNA.

Experiments conducted on RNA transcripts in Pseudomonas syringae DC3000 revealed that two gamma-150 RNAs in that organism are transcribed as separate RNA molecules. The transcript length is roughly 380 nucleotides in size, which is almost twice as large as the gamma-150 motif itself. It is likely that they are transcribed by RpoN, a protein that is also referred to as sigma 54.

Structurally, the gamma-150 motif consists of four independent stem-loops. The first stem-loop (the stem-loop closest to the 5' end of the RNA) has significant covariation in support of its identity as an RNA (see secondary structure prediction). The second and fourth have more modest evidence, while the third stem-loop might be poorly conserved, or not genuine. Several regions of high conservation of nucleotide identity are present throughout the RNA motif, and many contain short runs of adenosines.
