= Acinetobacter nosocomialis =

Scientific classification
- Domain: Bacteria
- Kingdom: Pseudomonadati
- Phylum: Pseudomonadota
- Class: Gammaproteobacteria
- Order: Pseudomonadales
- Family: Moraxellaceae
- Genus: Acinetobacter
- Species: A. nosocomialis

Binomial name
- Acinetobacter nosocomialis Nemec et al., 2011

Type strain
- CCM 7791, Dijkshoorn Ac2376, Dijkshoorn serial no. 109, LMG 10619, NIPH 2119, RUH 2376

Species of bacterium

Acinetobacter nosocomialis is a gram-negative, strictly aerobic bacterium from the genus Acinetobacter isolated from a patient at MetroHealth in Cleveland, Ohio. Acinetobacter nosocomialis belongs to the Acinetobacter calcoaceticus-baumannii complex.
