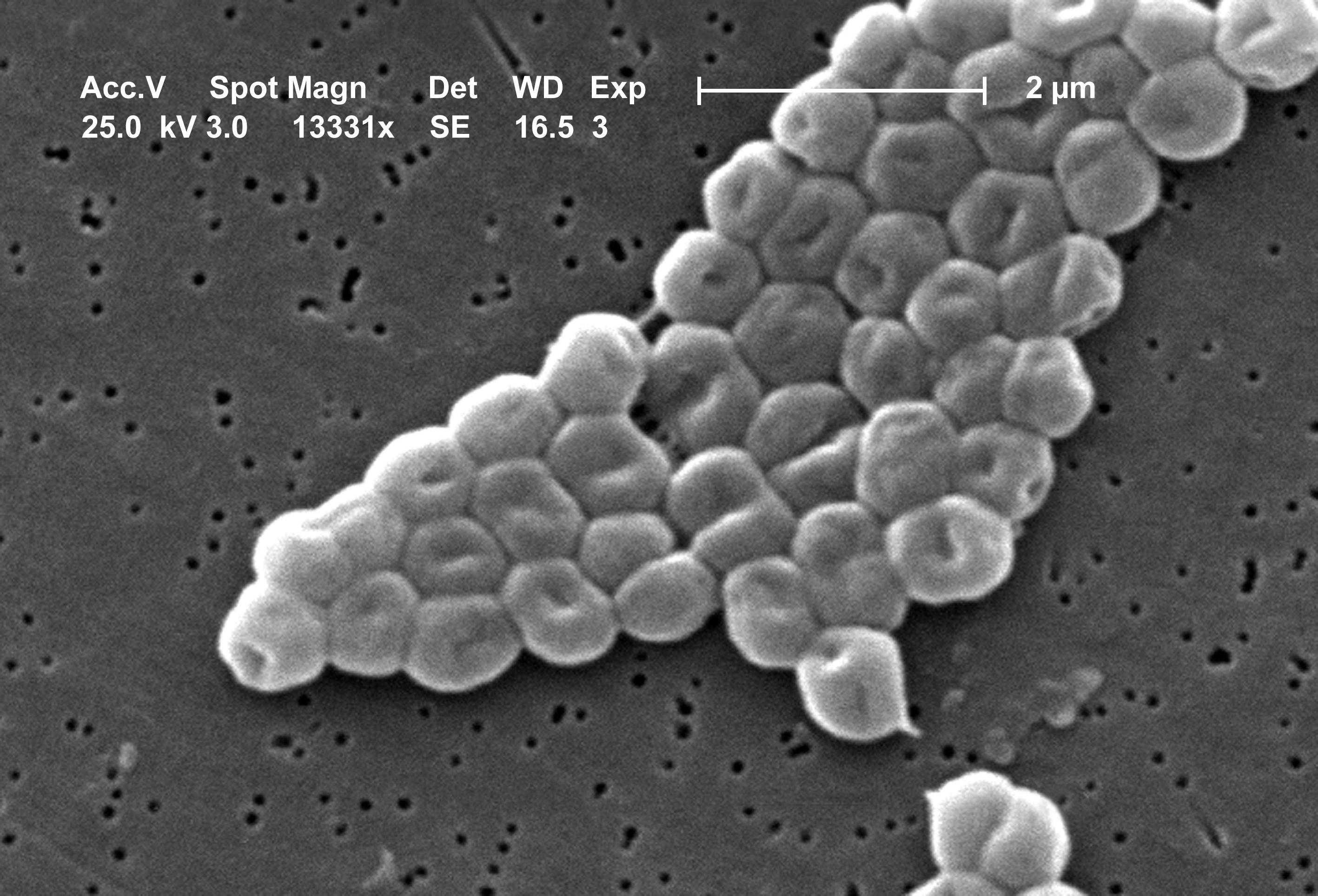
- Acinetobacter baumannii

Scientific classification
- Domain: Bacteria
- Kingdom: Pseudomonadati
- Phylum: Pseudomonadota
- Class: Gammaproteobacteria
- Order: Pseudomonadales
- Family: Moraxellaceae
- Genus: Acinetobacter; Brisou & Prévot 1954

Species
- Acinetobacter albensis Acinetobacter apis Acinetobacter baumannii Acinetobacter baylyi Acinetobacter beijerinckii Acinetobacter bereziniae Acinetobacter bohemicus Acinetobacter boissieri Acinetobacter bouvetii Acinetobacter brisouii Acinetobacter calcoaceticus Acinetobacter celticus Acinetobacter chengduensis Acinetobacter colistiniresistens Acinetobacter courvalinii Acinetobacter cumulans Acinetobacter defluvii Acinetobacter dispersus Acinetobacter dijkshoorniae Acinetobacter equi Acinetobacter gandensis Acinetobacter gerneri Acinetobacter guangdongensis Acinetobacter guerrae Acinetobacter guillouiae Acinetobacter gyllenbergii Acinetobacter haemolyticus Acinetobacter harbinensis Acinetobacter indicus Acinetobacter junii Acinetobacter kookii Acinetobacter lactucae Acinetobacter lanii Acinetobacter larvae Acinetobacter lwoffii Acinetobacter modestus Acinetobacter nectaris Acinetobacter nosocomialis Acinetobacter oryzae Acinetobacter parvus Acinetobacter pakistanensis Acinetobacter populi Acinetobacter portensis Acinetobacter proteolyticus Acinetobacter pittii Acinetobacter piscicola Acinetobacter pragensis Acinetobacter proteolyticus Acinetobacter pseudolwoffii Acinetobacter pullicarnis Acinetobacter pullorum Acinetobacter puyangensis Acinetobacter qingfengensis Acinetobacter radioresistens Acinetobacter rudis Acinetobacter schindleri Acinetobacter seifertii Acinetobacter shaoyimingii Acinetobacter soli Acinetobacter stercoris Acinetobacter tandoii Acinetobacter tjernbergiae Acinetobacter towneri Acinetobacter ursingii Acinetobacter variabilis Acinetobacter venetianus Acinetobacter vivianii Acinetobacter wanghuae Acinetobacter wuhouensis

= Acinetobacter =

Genus of bacteria

Acinetobacter is a genus of Gram-negative bacteria belonging to the wider class of Gammaproteobacteria. Acinetobacter species are oxidase-negative, exhibit twitching motility, and occur in pairs under magnification.

They are important soil organisms, where they contribute to the mineralization of, for example, aromatic compounds. Acinetobacter species are a key source of infection in debilitated patients in the hospital, in particular the species Acinetobacter baumannii.

== Description ==
Species of the genus Acinetobacter are strictly aerobic, nonfermentative, Gram-negative bacilli. They show mostly a coccobacillary morphology on nonselective agar. Rods predominate in fluid media, especially during early growth.

The morphology of Acinetobacter species can be quite variable in Gram-stained human clinical specimens, and cannot be used to differentiate Acinetobacter from other common causes of infection.

Most strains of Acinetobacter, except some of the A. lwoffii strain, grow well on MacConkey agar (without salt). Although officially classified as not lactose-fermenting, they are often partially lactose-fermenting when grown on MacConkey agar. They are oxidase-negative, catalase-positive, indole-negative, nonmotile, and usually nitrate-negative.

Bacteria of the genus Acinetobacter are known to form intracellular inclusions of polyhydroxyalkanoates under certain environmental conditions (e.g. lack of elements such as phosphorus, nitrogen, or oxygen combined with an excessive supply of carbon sources).

== Etymology ==
Acinetobacter is a compound word from scientific Greek [α + κίνητο + βακτηρ(ία)], meaning nonmotile rod. The first element acineto- appears as a somewhat baroque rendering of the Greek morpheme ακίνητο-, commonly transliterated in English is akineto-, but actually stems from the French cinetique and was adopted directly into English. Nevertheless, the French word also originates from the Greek privative α + κίνησις (motion) confirming the same origin from a different path.

== Taxonomy ==
The genus Acinetobacter comprises 38 validly named species.

== Identification ==
Identification of Acinetobacter species is complicated by lack of standard identification techniques. Initially, identification was based on phenotypic characteristics such as growth temperature, colony morphology, growth medium, carbon sources, gelatin hydrolysis, glucose fermentation, among others. This method allowed identification of A. calcoaceticus–A. baumannii complex by the formation of smooth, rounded, mucoid colonies at 37 °C. Closely related species could not be differentiated and individual species such as A. baumannii and Acinetobacter genomic species 3 could not be positively identified phenotypically.

Because routine identification in the clinical microbiology laboratory is not yet possible, Acinetobacter isolates are divided and grouped into three main complexes:

- Acinetobacter calcoaceticus-baumannii complex: glucose-oxidising nonhemolytic (A. baumannii can be identified by OXA-51 typing)
- Acinetobacter lwoffii: glucose-negative nonhemolytic
- Acinetobacter haemolyticus: hemolytic

Different species of bacteria in this genus can be identified using fluorescence-lactose-denitrification to find the amount of acid produced by metabolism of glucose. The other reliable identification test at genus level is chromosomal DNA transformation assay. In this assay, a naturally competent tryptophan auxotrophic mutant of Acinetobacter baylyi (BD4 trpE27) is transformed with the total DNA of a putative Acinetobacter isolate and the transformation mixture is plated on a brain heart infusion agar. The growth is then harvested after incubation for 24 h at 30 °C, plating on an Acinetobacter minimal agar (AMA), and incubating at 30 °C for 108 h. Growth on the AMA indicates a positive transformation assay and confirms the isolate as a member of the genus Acinetobacter. E. coli HB101 and A. calcoaceticus MTCC1921T can be used as the negative and positive controls, respectively.

Some of the molecular methods used in species identification are repetitive extragenic palindromic sequence-based PCR, ribotyping, pulsed field gel electrophoresis (PFGE), random amplified polymorphic DNA, amplified fragment length polymorphism (AFLP), restriction and sequence analysis of tRNA and 16S-23S rRNA gene spacers and amplified 16S ribosomal DNA restriction analysis (ARDRA). PFGE, AFLP, and ARDRA are validated common methods in use today because of their discriminative ability. However, most recent methods include multilocus sequence typing and multilocus PCR and electrospray ionization mass spectrometry, which are based on amplification of highly conserved housekeeping genes and can be used to study the genetic relatedness between different isolates.

== Habitat ==
Acinetobacter species are widely distributed in nature, and commonly occur in soil and water. Their ability to survive on moist and dry surfaces, as well as to survive exposure to various common disinfectants, allows some Acinetobacter species to survive in a hospital environment. Furthermore, Acinetobacter species can grow at a broad range of temperatures, allowing them to survive in a broad array of environments.

== Clinical significance ==
Acinetobacter is frequently isolated in nosocomial infections, and is especially prevalent in intensive care units, where both sporadic cases and epidemic and endemic occurrences are common. A. baumannii is a frequent cause of hospital-acquired pneumonia, especially of late-onset, ventilator-associated pneumonia. It can cause various other infections, including skin and wound infections, bacteremia, and meningitis, but A. lwoffi is mostly responsible for the latter.

Of the Acinetobacter, A. baumannii is the greatest cause of human disease, having been implicated in a number of hospital-acquired infections such as bacteremia, urinary tract infections (UTIs), secondary meningitis, infective endocarditis, and wound and burn infections. In particular, A. baumannii is frequently isolated as the cause of hospital-acquired pneumonia among patients admitted to the intensive care unit. Risk factors include long-term intubation and tracheal or lung aspiration. In most cases of ventilator-associated pneumonia, the equipment used for artificial ventilation such as endotracheal tubes or bronchoscopes serve as the source of infection and result in the colonization of the lower respiratory tract by A. baumannii. In some cases, the bacteria can go on to enter the bloodstream, resulting in bacteremia with mortality rates ranging from 32% to 52%. UTIs caused by A. baumannii appear to be associated with continuous catheterization, as well as antibiotic therapy. A. baumannii has also been reported to infect skin and soft tissue in traumatic injuries and postsurgical wounds. A. baumannii commonly infect burns and may result in complications owing to difficulty in treatment and eradication. Though less common, some evidence also links this bacterium to meningitis, most often following invasive surgery, and, in very rare cases, to community-acquired primary meningitis wherein the majority of the victims were children. Case reports also link A. baumannii to endocarditis, keratitis, peritonitis, and very rarely fatal neonatal sepsis.

The clinical significance of A. baumannii is partially due to its capacity to develop resistance against many available antibiotics. Reports indicate that it possesses resistance against broad-spectrum cephalosporins, β-lactam antibiotics, aminoglycosides, and quinolones. Resistance to carbapenems is also being increasingly reported. A. baumannii can survive on the human skin or dry surfaces for weeks and is resistant to a variety of disinfectants, making it particularly easy to spread in a hospital setting. Antibiotic resistance genes are often plasmid-borne, and plasmids present in Acinetobacter strains can be transferred to other pathogenic bacteria by horizontal gene transfer.

In healthy individuals, Acinetobacter colonies on the skin correlate with low incidence of allergies; Acinetobacter is thought to be allergy-protective.

== Treatment ==
Acinetobacter species are innately resistant to many classes of antibiotics, including penicillin, chloramphenicol, and often aminoglycosides. Resistance to fluoroquinolones has been reported during therapy, which has also resulted in increased resistance to other drug classes mediated through active drug efflux. A dramatic increase in antibiotic resistance in Acinetobacter strains has been reported by the Centers for Disease Control and Prevention (CDC), and the carbapenems are recognised as the gold-standard and treatment of last resort. Acinetobacter species are unusual in that they are sensitive to sulbactam, which is commonly used to inhibit bacterial beta-lactamase, but this is an example of the antibacterial property of sulbactam itself. Recently sulbactam-durlobactam, a new antibacterial combination undergoing phase 3 trial, has demonstrated good in vitro activity also against carbapenem-resistant A. baumannii isolates (92% susceptibility).

In November 2004, the CDC reported an increasing number of A. baumannii bloodstream infections in patients at military medical facilities in which service members injured in the Iraq/Kuwait region during Operation Iraqi Freedom and in Afghanistan during Operation Enduring Freedom were treated. Most of these were multidrug-resistant. Among one set of isolates from Walter Reed Army Medical Center, 13 (35%) were susceptible to imipenem only, and two (4%) were resistant to all drugs tested. One antimicrobial agent, colistin (polymyxin E), has been used to treat infections with multidrug-resistant A. baumannii; however, antimicrobial susceptibility testing for colistin was not performed on isolates described in this report. Because A. baumannii can survive on dry surfaces up to 20 days, they pose a high risk of spread and contamination in hospitals, potentially putting immunocompromised and other patients at risk for drug-resistant infections that are often fatal and, in general, expensive to treat. Trials to implement vaccines to prevent Acinetobacter infections were documented.

Reports suggest this bacterium is susceptible to phage therapy.

Gene-silencing antisense oligomers in a form called peptide-conjugated phosphorodiamidate morpholino oligomers have also been reported to inhibit growth in tests carried out in animals infected with antibiotic-resistant A. baumannii.

Sulbactam/durlobactam (Xacduro) was approved for medical use in the United States in May 2023.

== Aseptic technique ==
The frequency of nosocomial infections in British hospitals prompted the National Health Service to research the effectiveness of anions for air purification, finding that repeated airborne Acinetobacter infections in a ward were eliminated by the installation of a negative air ioniser—the infection rate fell to zero.

== Natural transformation ==
Bacterial transformation involves the transfer of DNA from a donor to a recipient bacterium through the intervening liquid medium. Recipient bacteria must first enter a special physiological state termed competence to receive donor DNA. A. calcoaceticus is induced to become competent for natural transformation by dilution of a stationary culture into fresh nutrient medium. Competence is gradually lost during prolonged exponential growth and for a period after entrance into the stationary state. The DNA taken up may be used to repair DNA damage or as a means to exchange genetic information by horizontal gene transfer. Natural transformation in A. calcoaceticus may protect against exposure to DNA-damaging conditions in the natural environment of these bacteria, as appears to be the case for other bacterial species capable of transformation.
