= CFTR inhibitory factor =

Bacterial protein

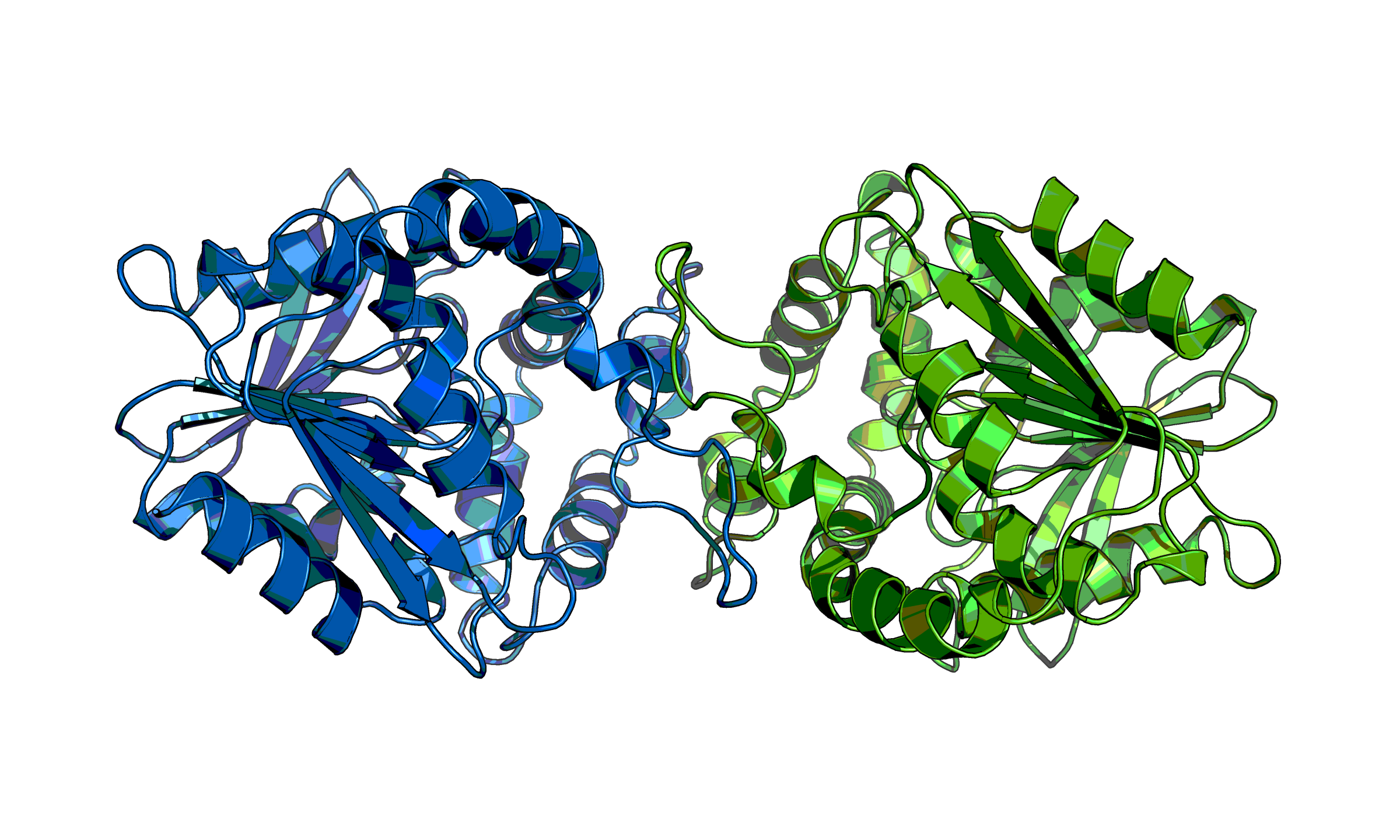
Ribbon diagram of the Cif dimer from P. aeruginosa PA14. From PDB: 3KD2.

The CFTR inhibitory factor (Cif) is a protein virulence factor secreted by the Gram-negative bacteria Pseudomonas aeruginosa, Acinetobacter nosocomialis, and possibly Acinetobacter baumannii. Discovered at Dartmouth Medical School, Cif is able to alter the trafficking of select ABC transporters in eukaryotic epithelial cells, such as the cystic fibrosis transmembrane conductance regulator (CFTR), and P-glycoprotein by interfering with the host deubiquitinating machinery. By promoting the ubiquitin-mediated degradation of CFTR, Cif is able to phenocopy (mimick the effect of) cystic fibrosis at the cellular level. It acts as a epoxide hydrolase.

The cif gene in Pseudomonas aeruginosa is transcribed as part of a 3 gene operon morB-(unnamed MFS transporter)-cif, whose expression is negatively regulated by CifR, a TetR family repressor, a gene placed immediately upstream of the operon, transcribing in an opposite direction. The binding site for CifR is in the intergenic space between CifR and morB, causing a repression of transcription in both directions. The repression is released in the presence of epoxides. The Acinetobacter homolog is largely similar, except the operon only contains two genes, morB-cif.

== Structure ==
Cif belongs to the α/β hydrolase family of proteins. Its structure was determined by X-ray crystallography and consists of the canonical α/β hydrolase fold with a cap domain, which it uses to constitutively homo-dimerize in solution. The active site is buried in the interior of the protein at the interface between the α/β hydrolase core and the cap.

== Action and mechanism ==
=== Enzymatic ===
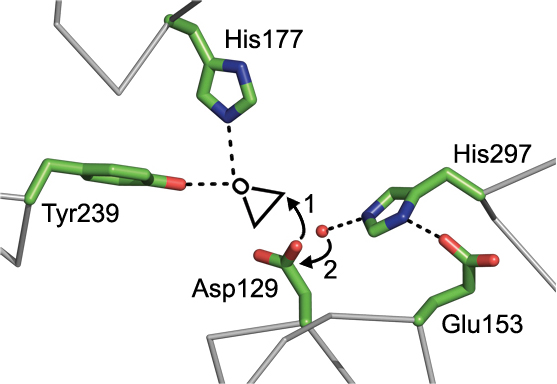
The active site of Cif is shown with a Cα trace in gray, and side chains of select residues playing a role in catalysis are displayed as sticks. From PDB: 3KD2.

Cif is an epoxide hydrolase (EH) with unique substrate selectivity. Cif is the first example of an EH serving as a virulence factor. Based on structural comparison, it appears that the enzyme utilizes a catalytic triad of residues Asp129, Glu153 and His297, with accessory residues His177 and Tyr239 coordinating the epoxide oxygen during ring opening. Cif is also the first example of an EH utilizing a His-Tyr pair to coordinate an epoxide substrate, rather than the canonical Tyr-Tyr pair. In the proposed enzyme mechanism, Asp129 nucleophilically attacks a carbon of the epoxide moiety of a substrate, forming an ester linked enzyme-acyl intermediate. The preference for which carbon is attacked varies depending upon the substrate. In the second step of the reaction, a water molecule is activated by the charge-relay His297-Glu153 pair, and undergoes nucleophilic attack on the Cγ of Asp129. This hydrolyzes the ester group, liberating the hydrolysis product as a vicinal diol.

=== Cellular ===
Cif was first discovered by co-culturing P. aeruginosa with human airway epithelial cells and monitoring the resulting effect on chloride ion efflux across a polarized monolayer. After co-culture, the CFTR specific chloride ion efflux was found to be drastically reduced. This was determined to be caused by reduced levels of CFTR at the apical surface of these cells. This effect was later found to be the result of a single secreted protein produced by P. aeruginosa, which was named the CFTR inhibitory factor for this initial phenotype. Cif is secreted by P. aeruginosa PA14 as soluble protein as well as packaged into outer membrane vesicles (OMV). Cif is far more potent when applied in OMVs, likely due to efficiency of delivery. Purified, recombinant Cif protein can be applied to polarized monolayers of mammalian cells and promote the removal of CFTR and P-glycoprotein from the apical membrane.

Cif accomplishes this by interfering with the host deubiquitylation system. Specifically, it stabilizes the binding of G3BP1 to USP10. G3BP1 inhibits USP10 and USP10 is responsible for deubiquitinating proteins such as CFTR. The result is therefore reduced deubiquitination and increased protein degradation. It is unclear how the epoxide hydrolase action leads to such a stabilizing effect, but it is clear that the two actions are connected: "mutations to the active site of Cif that reduce epoxide hydrolase activity also reduce the effect of Cif on CFTR degradation."
