= Agitococcus =

Scientific classification
- Domain: Bacteria
- Kingdom: Bacillati
- Phylum: Bacillota
- Class: Bacilli
- Order: Lactobacillales
- Family: Carnobacteriaceae
- Genus: Agitococcus; Franzmann and Skerman 1981
- Species: A. lubricus

Binomial name
- Agitococcus lubricus Franzmann and Skerman 1981

Genus of bacteria

Agitococcus is a genus in the phylum Bacillota (Bacteria).

== Etymology ==
The name Agitococcus derives from the Latin agito, to shake; and Neo-Latin coccus (from Greek kokkos (κόκκος), berry).

== Species ==
The genus contains a single species, namely Agitococcus lubricus (Franzmann and Skerman 1981), type species of the genus. The specific name is from the Latin lubricus, slippery.
