= Butyrate esterase =

Histological staining compound

α-Naphthyl butyrate esterase, also referred to as naphthyl butyrate esterase or butyrate esterase, is a histological stain specific for white blood cells of the monocytic proliferation line.
