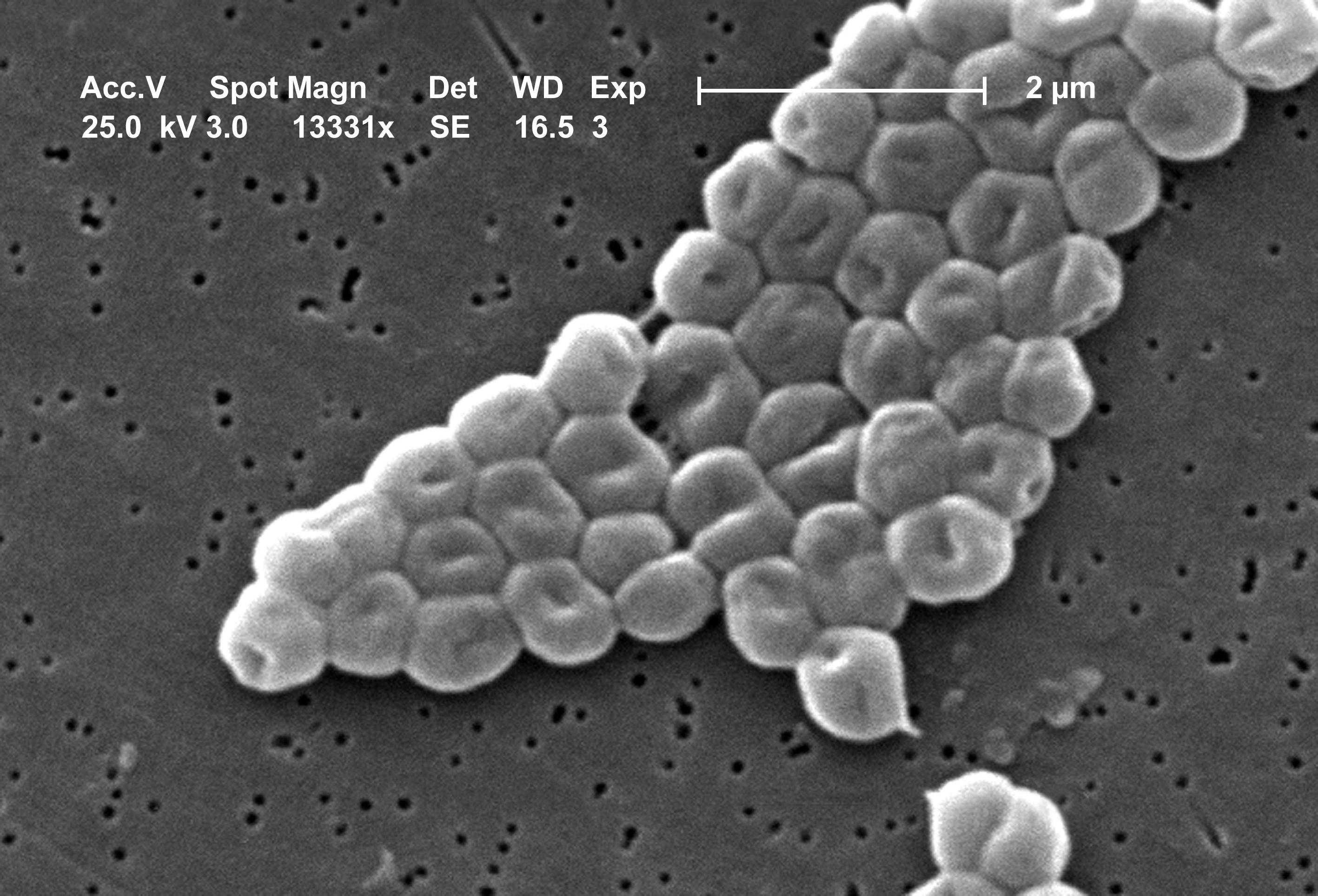
- Acinetobacter baumannii

Scientific classification
- Domain: Bacteria
- Kingdom: Pseudomonadati
- Phylum: Pseudomonadota
- Class: Gammaproteobacteria
- Order: Pseudomonadales
- Family: Moraxellaceae; Rossau et al. 1991

Genera
- Acinetobacter; Agitococcus; Alkanindiges; Amnimonas; Aquirhabdus; Branhamella (taxonomically invalid); Cavicella; Faucicola; Fluviicoccus; Hubeiibacter; Moraxella; Paraperlucidibaca; Perlucidibaca; Psychrobacter

= Moraxellaceae =

Family of bacteria

The Moraxellaceae are a family of Gammaproteobacteria, including a few pathogenic species. Others are harmless commensals of mammals and humans or occur in water or soil. The species are mesophilic or psychrotrophic (Psychrobacter).

Moraxella catarrhalis and Acinetobacter baumannii are human pathogens, and Moraxella bovis is the cause of "pinkeye" of cattle (infectious bovine keratoconjunctivitis).
