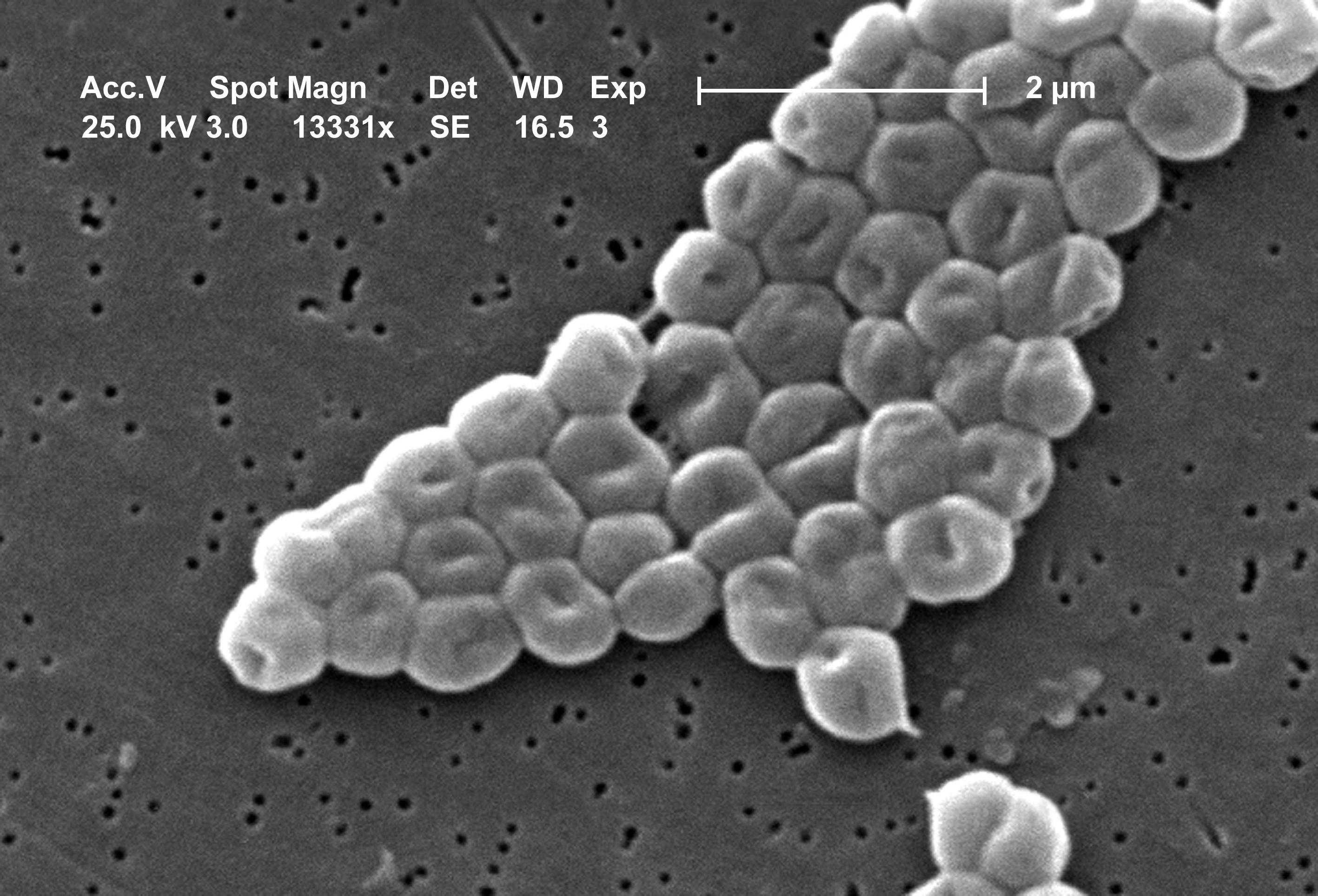
- Acinetobacter baumannii

Scientific classification
- Domain: Bacteria
- Kingdom: Pseudomonadati
- Phylum: Pseudomonadota
- Class: Gammaproteobacteria
- Order: Pseudomonadales; Orla-Jensen 1921

Families and Genera
- Azotobacteraceae Pribram 1933; Moraxellaceae Rossau et al. 1991; Pseudohongiellaceae Chuvochina et al. 2024; Pseudomonadaceae Winslow et al. 1917 (Approved Lists 1980); Ventosimonadaceae Lin et al. 2016

= Pseudomonadales =

Order of bacteria

The Pseudomonadales are an order of Pseudomonadota. A few members are pathogens, such as species of Pseudomonas, Moraxella, and Acinetobacter, which may cause disease in humans, animals and plants.

== Pseudomonas ==
The bacterial genus Pseudomonas includes the opportunistic human pathogen P. aeruginosa, plant pathogenic bacteria, plant beneficial bacteria, ubiquitous soil bacteria with bioremediation capabilities and other species that cause spoilage of milk and dairy products. Pseudomonas aeruginosa can cause chronic opportunistic infections that have become increasingly apparent in immunocompromised patients and the ageing population of industrialised societies. The genome sequences of several pseudomonads have become available in recent years and researchers are beginning to use the data to make new discoveries about this bacterium.

== Acinetobacter ==
The genus Acinetobacter is a group of Gram-negative, nonmotile and nonfermentative bacteria belonging to the family Moraxellaceae. They are important soil organisms where they contribute to the mineralisation of, for example, aromatic compounds. Acinetobacter species are able to survive on various surfaces (both moist and dry) in the hospital environment, thereby being an important source of infection in debilitated patients. These bacteria are innately resistant to many classes of antibiotics. In addition, Acinetobacter is uniquely suited to exploitation for biotechnological purposes.

== See also ==
- Gamma-150 RNA motif, a unique RNA structure that is found in bacteria within the order
