= List of restriction enzyme cutting sites: O–R =

Legend of nucleobases
Code	Nucleotide represented
A	Adenine (A)
C	Cytosine (C)
G	Guanine (G)
T	Thymine (T)
N	A, C, G or T
M	A or C
R	A or G
W	A or T
Y	C or T
S	C or G
K	G or T
H	A, C or T
B	C, G or T
V	A, C or G
D	A, G or T

This article contains a list of the most studied restriction enzymes whose names start with O to R inclusive. It contains approximately 130 enzymes. The following information is given:

- Enzyme: Accepted name of the molecule, according to the internationally adopted nomenclature, and bibliographical references. (Further reading: see the section "Nomenclature" in the article "Restriction enzyme".)
- PDB code: Code used to identify the structure of a protein in the PDB database of protein structures. The 3D atomic structure of a protein provides highly valuable information to understand the intimate details of its mechanism of action.
- Source: Organism that naturally produces the enzyme.
- Recognition sequence: Sequence of DNA recognized by the enzyme and to which it specifically binds.
- Cut: Cutting site and DNA products of the cut. The recognition sequence and the cutting site usually match, but sometimes the cutting site can be dozens of nucleotides away from the recognition site.
- Isoschizomers and neoschizomers: An isoschizomer is an enzyme that recognizes the same sequence as another. A neoschizomer is a special type of isoschizomer that recognizes the same sequence as another, but cuts in a different manner. A maximum number of 8-10 most common isoschizomers are indicated for every enzyme but there may be many more. Neoschizomers are shown in bold and green color font (e.g.: **BamHI**). When "None on date" is indicated, that means that there were no registered isoschizomers in the databases on that date with a clearly defined cutting site. Isoschizomers indicated in white font and grey background correspond to enzymes not listed in the current lists:

as in this not listed enzyme:	EcoR70I

== Restriction enzymes ==
=== O ===
**Enzyme**	**PDB code**	Source	**Recognition sequence**	**Cut**	**Isoschizomers**
OfoI		Oscillatoria foreaui A-1340	5' CYCGRG; 3' GRGCYC	5' ---C YCGRG--- 3'; 3' ---GRGCY C--- 5'	AquI, AvaI, Bse15I, BspLU4I, Eco27kI, **Nli3877I**, PlaAI, PunAI
OkrAI		Oceanospirillum kriegii	5' GGATCC; 3' CCTAGG	5' ---G GATCC--- 3'; 3' ---CCTAG G--- 5'	BamHI, Bce751I, BnaI, Bsp98I, BstI, OkrAI, SolI, Uba4009I
OliI		Oceanospirillum linum 4-5D	5' CACN_{4}GTG; 3' GTGN_{4}CAC	5' ---CACNN NNGTG--- 3'; 3' ---GTGNN NNCAC--- 5'	AleI
OxaNI		Oerskovia xanthineolytica N	5' CCTNAGG; 3' GGANTCC	5' ---CC TNAGG--- 3'; 3' ---GGANT CC--- 5'	AocI, BliHKI, BspR7I, CvnI, Lmu60I, OxaNI, SauI, SshAI

=== P ===
**Enzyme**	**PDB code**	Source	**Recognition sequence**	**Cut**	**Isoschizomers**
PabI	2DVY	Pyrococcus abyssi	5' GTAC; 3' CATG	5' ---GTA C--- 3'; 3' ---C ATG--- 5'	**AfaI**, Csp6I, CviQI, **HpyBI**, HpyBI, **PlaAII**, **RsaI**, / **RsaNI**,
PacI		Pseudomonas alcaligenes	5' TTAATTAA; 3' AATTAATT	5' ---TTAAT TAA--- 3'; 3' ---AAT TAATT--- 5'
Pac25I		Pseudomonas alcaligenes	5' CCCGGG; 3' GGGCCC	5' ---C CCGGG--- 3'; 3' ---GGGCC C--- 5'	AhyI, Cfr9I, EaeAI, EclRI, PspAI, **PspALI**, XcyI, XmaI, XmaCI
PaeI		Pseudomonas aeruginosa	5' GCATGC; 3' CGTACG	5' ---GCATG C--- 3'; 3' ---C GTACG--- 5'
PaeAI		Pseudomonas aeruginosa	5' CCGCGG; 3' GGCGCC	5' ---CCGC GG--- 3'; 3' ---GG CGCC--- 5'
PaeBI		Pseudomonas aeruginosa - 18	5' CCCGGG; 3' GGGCCC	5' ---CCC GGG--- 3'; 3' ---GGG CCC--- 5'	AhyI, Cfr9I, EaeAI, EclRI, **PspALI**, **SmaI**, TspMI, XcyI, XmaI, XmaCI
PaeHI		Pseudomonas aeruginosa 4148	5' GRGCYC; 3' CYCGRG	5' ---GRGCY C--- 3'; 3' ---C YCGRG--- 5'
PaeHII		Pseudomonas aeruginosa 4148	5' CTGCAG; 3' GACGTC	5' ---CTGCA G--- 3'; 3' ---G ACGTC--- 5'	AliAJI, BspBI, BspMAI, CfuII, Ecl2zI, HalII, Srl5DI, Sst12I, XcpI
PaeQI		Pseudomonas aeruginosa Q2	5' CCGCGG; 3' GGCGCC	5' ---CCGC GG--- 3'; 3' ---GG CGCC--- 5'
PaeR7I		Pseudomonas aeruginosa PA0303 pMG7	5' CTCGAG; 3' GAGCTC	5' ---C TCGAG--- 3'; 3' ---GAGCT C--- 5'	AbrI, BluI, BssHI, MavI, Sau3239I, Sol10179I, StrI, TliI
Pae2kI		Pseudomonas aeruginosa 2k	5' AGATCT; 3' TCTAGA	5' ---A GATCT--- 3'; 3' ---TCTAG A--- 5'
Pae5kI		Pseudomonas aeruginosa 5k	5' CCGCGG; 3' GGCGCC	5' ---CCGC GG--- 3'; 3' ---GG CGCC--- 5'
Pae14kI		Pseudomonas aeruginosa 14k	5' CCGCGG; 3' GGCGCC	5' ---CCGC GG--- 3'; 3' ---GG CGCC--- 5'
Pae17kI		Pseudomonas aeruginosa 17k	5' CAGCTG; 3' GTCGAC	5' ---CAG CTG--- 3'; 3' ---GTC GAC--- 5'
Pae18kI		Pseudomonas aeruginosa 18k	5' AGATCT; 3' TCTAGA	5' ---A GATCT--- 3'; 3' ---TCTAG A--- 5'
PagI		Pseudomonas alcaligenes Sau 14-027	5' TCATGA; 3' AGTACT	5' ---T CATGA--- 3'; 3' ---AGTAC T--- 5'
PalI		Providencia alcalifaciens	5' GGCC; 3' CCGG	5' ---GG CC--- 3'; 3' ---CC GG--- 5'
PamI		Phormidium ambiguum	5' TGCGCA; 3' ACGCGT	5' ---TGC GCA--- 3'; 3' ---ACG CGT--- 5'	Acc16I, AosI, AviII, FdiII, FspI, MstI, NsbI, Pun14627I
PamII		Phormidium ambiguum	5' GRCGYC; 3' CYGCRG	5' ---GR CGYC--- 3'; 3' ---CYGC RG--- 5'	AsuIII, BsaHI, BstACI, HgiDI, HgiGI, HgiHII, Hin1I, Hsp92I, Msp17I
PanI		Pseudomonas alkanolytica	5' CTCGAG; 3' GAGCTC	5' ---C TCGAG--- 3'; 3' ---GAGCT C--- 5'	BspAAI, BstVI, MlaAI, PaeR7I, Sbi68I, Sfr274I, SlaI, XpaI
PasI		Pseudomonas anguilliseptica RFL1	5' CCCWGGG; 3' GGGWCCC	5' ---CC CWGGG--- 3'; 3' ---GGGWC CC--- 5'	— None in May 2010 —
PauI		Paracoccus alcaliphilus ZVK3-3	5' GCGCGC; 3' CGCGCG	5' ---G CGCGC--- 3'; 3' ---CGCGC G--- 5'
PauAI		Phormidium autumnale	5' RCATGY; 3' YGTACR	5' ---RCATG Y--- 3'; 3' ---Y GTACR--- 5'
PauAII		Phormidium autumnale	5' TTTAAA; 3' AAATTT	5' ---TTT AAA--- 3'; 3' ---AAA TTT--- 5'	AhaIII, DraI, SruI
PceI		Planococcus citreus 55	5' AGGCCT; 3' TCCGGA	5' ---AGG CCT--- 3'; 3' ---TCC GGA--- 5'	AatI, AspMI, GdiI, PceI, Pme55I, SarI, Sru30DI, SseBI, SteI, StuI
PciI		Planococcus citreus SE-F45	5' ACATGT; 3' TGTACA	5' ---A CATGT--- 3'; 3' ---TGTAC A--- 5'
PctI		Planococcus citreus SM	5' GAATGC; 3' CTTACG	5' ---GAATGCN --- 3'; 3' ---CTTAC GN--- 5'	Asp26HI, Asp27HI, Asp35HI: BmaHI, / BsaMI, BscCI, Mva1269I
Pde12I		Paracoccus denitrificans 12	5' GGNCC; 3' CCNGG	5' ---G GNCC--- 3'; 3' ---CCNG G--- 5'	AvcI, Bal228I, Bce22I, Bsp1894I, Bsu54I, Cfr13I, NspIV, **UnbI**
Pde133I		Paracoccus denitrificans 133	5' GGCC; 3' CCGG	5' ---GG CC--- 3'; 3' ---CC GG--- 5'
Pde137I		Paracoccus denitrificans 137	5' CCGG; 3' GGCC	5' ---C CGG--- 3'; 3' ---GGC C--- 5'
PdiI		Pseudomonas diminuta Mck 33-321	5' GCCGGC; 3' CGGCCG	5' ---GCC GGC--- 3'; 3' ---CGG CCG--- 5'
PdmI		Pseudomonas diminuta Auk 5-324	5' GAAN_{4}TTC; 3' CTTN_{4}AAG	5' ---GAANN NNTTC--- 3'; 3' ---CTTNN NNAAG--- 5'	Asp700I, BbvAI, MroXI, XmnI
PfaAI		Phormidium favosum	5' GGYRCC; 3' CCRYGG	5' ---G GYRCC--- 3'; 3' ---CCRYG G--- 5'	AccB1I, BanI, BbvBI, BshNI, Eco64I, HgiCI, HgiHI, MspB4I
PfaAII		Phormidium favosum	5' CATATG; 3' GTATAC	5' ---CA TATG--- 3'; 3' ---GTAT AC--- 5'
PfaAIII		Phormidium favosum	5' GCATGC; 3' CGTACG	5' ---GCATG C--- 3'; 3' ---C GTACG--- 5'
PfeI		Psychrobacter faecalis RFL1	5' GAWTC; 3' CTWAG	5' ---G AWTC--- 3'; 3' ---CTWA G--- 5'
Pfl8I		Pseudomonas fluorescens 8	5' GGATCC; 3' CCTAGG	5' ---G GATCC--- 3'; 3' ---CCTAG G--- 5'	AliAJI, BspBI, BsuBI, CflI, CfrA4I, PaePI, Pfl21I, PstI, SflII, Sst12I
Pfl21I		Pseudomonas sp. 21	5' CTGCAG; 3' GACGTC	5' ---CTGCA G--- 3'; 3' ---G ACGTC--- 5'
Pfl23II		Pseudomonas fluorescens RFL23	5' CGTACG; 3' GCATGC	5' ---C GTACG--- 3'; 3' ---GCATG C--- 5'
Pfl27I		Pseudomonas fluorescens RFL27	5' RGGWCCY; 3' YCCWGGR	5' ---RG GWCCY--- 3'; 3' ---YCCWG GR--- 5'
PflBI		Pseudomonas fluorescens type B	5' CCAN_{5}TGG; 3' GGTN_{5}ACC	5' ---CCANNNN NTGG--- 3'; 3' ---GGTN NNNNACC--- 5'	AccB7I, AcpII, Asp10HII, BasI, Esp1396I, PflMI, Van91I
PflFI		Pseudomonas fluorescens biotype F	5' GACNNNGTC; 3' CTGNNNCAG	5' ---GACN NNGTC--- 3'; 3' ---CTGNN NCAG--- 5'	AspI, AtsI, PsyI, TelI, Tth111I
PflKI		Pseudomonas fluorescens	5' GGCC; 3' CCGG	5' ---GG CC--- 3'; 3' ---CC GG--- 5'
PflMI		Pseudomonas fluorescens	5' CCAN_{5}TGG; 3' GGTN_{5}ACC	5' ---CCANNNN NTGG--- 3'; 3' ---GGTN NNNNACC--- 5'	AccB7I, AcpII, Asp10HII, BasI, Esp1396I, PflBI, Van91I
PfoI		Pseudomonas fluorescens biovar 126	5' TCCNGGA; 3' AGGNCCT	5' ---T CCNGGA--- 3'; 3' ---AGGNCC T--- 5'
PgaI		Pseudomonas gladioli B4	5' ATCGAT; 3' TAGCTA	5' ---AT CGAT--- 3'; 3' ---TAGC TA--- 5'	BanIII, BbvAII, BliAI, BscI, BspJI, BstNZ169I, ClaI, LcaI, Ssp27144I
PhaI		Pasteurella haemolytica	5' GCATC; 3' CGTAG	5' ---GCATCN_{4}N NNNN--- 3'; 3' ---CGTAGN_{4}NNNNN --- 5'
PhoI		Pyrococcus horikoshii OT3	5' GGCC; 3' CCGG	5' ---GG CC--- 3'; 3' ---CC GG--- 5'
PinAI		Pseudomonas inequalis	5' ACCGGT; 3' TGGCCA	5' ---A CCGGT--- 3'; 3' ---TGGCC A--- 5'	AgeI, AsiAI, / AsiGI, / BshTI; CsiAI, CspAI
PinBI		Phormidium inundatum	5' ATGCAT; 3' TACGTA	5' ---ATGCA T--- 3'; 3' ---T ACGTA--- 5'	EcoT22I, BfrBI, Mph1103I, NsiI, **Ppu10I**, SepI, SspD5II, Zsp2I
PinBII		Phormidium inundatum	5' TCCGGA; 3' AGGCCT	5' ---T CCGGA--- 3'; 3' ---AGGCC T--- 5'	Aor13HI, BlfI, Bsp13I, BspEI, Bsu23I, Kpn2I, PinBII, PtaI
PlaI		Phormidium lapideum	5' GGCC; 3' CCGG	5' ---GG CC--- 3'; 3' ---CC GG--- 5'
PlaII		Phormidium lapideum	5' TTCGAA; 3' AAGCTT	5' ---TT CGAA--- 3'; 3' ---AAGC TT--- 5'	Asp10HI, BimI, Bsp119I, BstBI, Csp68KII, MlaI, SfuI, SspRFI
PlaAI		Phormidium laminosum	5' CYCGRG; 3' GRGCYC	5' ---C YCGRG--- 3'; 3' ---GRGCY C--- 5'	AquI, BcoI, Bse15I, BspLU4I, Eco27kI, **Nli3877I**, OfoI, PunAI
PlaAII		Phormidium laminosum	5' GTAC; 3' CATG	5' ---GT AC--- 3'; 3' ---CA TG--- 5'	AfaI, **Csp6I**, **CviQI**, **CviRII**, HpyBI, **PabI**, RsaI, / **RsaNI**,
PleI		Pseudomonas lemoignei	5' GAGTC; 3' CTCAG	5' ---GAGTCNNNN N--- 3'; 3' ---CTCAGNNNNN --- 5'
Ple19I		Pseudomonas lemoignei 19	5' CGATCG; 3' GCTAGC	5' ---CGAT CG--- 3'; 3' ---GC TAGC--- 5'	Afa22MI, BspCI, ErhB9I, MvrI, Psu161I, PvuI, RshI, XorII
PmaCI		Pseudomonas maltophilia CB50P	5' CACGTG; 3' GTGCAC	5' ---CAC GTG--- 3'; 3' ---GTG CAC--- 5'	AcvI, BcoAI, BbrPI, Eco72I, PmlI, PspCI
PmeI		Pseudomonas mendocina	5' GTTTAAAC; 3' CAAATTTG	5' ---GTTT AAAC--- 3'; 3' ---CAAA TTTG--- 5'	MssI
Pme55I		Pseudomonas mendocina 55	5' AGGCCT; 3' TCCGGA	5' ---AGG CCT--- 3'; 3' ---TCC GGA--- 5'	AatI, AspMI, Eco147I, GdiI, PceI, SarI, Sru30DI, SseBI, SteI, StuI
PmlI		Pseudomonas maltophilia	5' CACGTG; 3' GTGCAC	5' ---CAC GTG--- 3'; 3' ---GTG CAC--- 5'	AcvI, BcoAI, BbrPI, Eco72I, PmaCI, PspCI
PovII		Proteus vulgaris	5' CAGCTG; 3' GTCGAC	5' ---CAG CTG--- 3'; 3' ---GTC GAC--- 5'
PpaAI		Phormidium papyraceum	5' TTCGAA; 3' AAGCTT	5' ---TT CGAA--- 3'; 3' ---AAGC TT--- 5'	AsuII, BimI, Bsp119I, CbiI, Csp68KII, SfuI, SspRFI, SviI
PpaAII		Phormidium papyraceum	5' TCGA; 3' AGCT	5' ---T CGA--- 3'; 3' ---AGC T--- 5'
PpeI		Phormidium persicinum	5' GGGCCC; 3' CCCGGG	5' ---GGGCC C--- 3'; 3' ---C CCGGG--- 5'	ApaI, **Bsp120I**, **PspOMI**
PpiI		Pseudomonas putida Jo 4-731	5' GAACN_{5}CTC; 3' CTTGN_{5}GAG	5' ---GAACN_{5}CTCN_{7}NNNNNN --- 3'; 3' ---CTTGN_{5}GAGN_{7}N NNNNN--- 5'
PpsI		Pseudomonas pseudoalcaligenes PL	5' GAGTC; 3' CTCAG	5' ---GAGTCNNNN N--- 3'; 3' ---CTCAGNNNNN --- 5'
Ppu10I		Pseudomonas putida RFL10	5' ATGCAT; 3' TACGTA	5' ---A TGCAT--- 3'; 3' ---TACGT A--- 5'	**BfrBI**, **Csp68KII**, **EcoT22I**, **Mph1103I**, **NsiI**, **SepI**, **SspD5II**
Ppu111I		Pseudomonas putida P111	5' GAATTC; 3' CTTAAG	5' ---G AATTC--- 3'; 3' ---CTTAA G--- 5'
PpuAI		Pseudomonas putida A1	5' CGTACG; 3' GCATGC	5' ---C GTACG--- 3'; 3' ---GCATG C--- 5'
PpuMI		Pseudomonas putida M	5' RGGWCCY; 3' YCCWGGR	5' ---RG GWCCY--- 3'; 3' ---YCCWG GR--- 5'
PpuXI		Pseudomonas putida X	5' RGGWCCY; 3' YCCWGGR	5' ---RG GWCCY--- 3'; 3' ---YCCWG GR--- 5'
PshAI		Plesiomonas shigelloides 319-73	5' GACN_{4}GTC; 3' CTGN_{4}CAG	5' ---GACNN NNGTC--- 3'; 3' ---CTGNN NNCAG--- 5'
PshBI		Plesiomonas shigelloides TPS970	5' ATTAAT; 3' TAATTA	5' ---AT TAAT--- 3'; 3' ---TAAT TA--- 5'	AseI, AsnI, BpoAI, Sru4DI, VspI
PsiI		Pseudomonas sp. SE-G49	5' TTATAA; 3' AATATT	5' ---TTA TAA--- 3'; 3' ---AAT ATT--- 5'
Psp03I		Phormidium sp.	5' GGWCC; 3' CCWGG	5' ---GGWC C--- 3'; 3' ---C CWGG--- 5'	**Bme216I**, **CauI**, **EagMI**, **FdiI**, **HgiBI**, **HgiHIII**, **SinI**, **VpaK11AI**
Psp5II		Pseudomonas sp. RFL5	5' RGGWCCY; 3' YCCWGGR	5' ---RG GWCCY--- 3'; 3' ---YCCWG GR--- 5'
Psp6I		Pseudomonas sp. B6	5' CCWGG; 3' GGWCC	5' --- CCWGG--- 3'; 3' ---GGWCC --- 5'	**AeuI**, **AglI**, **ApaORI**, **Bse17I**, EcoRII, **Fsp1604I**, SspAI, **Sth117I**
Psp23I		Pseudomonas sp. 23	5' CTGCAG; 3' GACGTC	5' ---CTGCA G--- 3'; 3' ---G ACGTC--- 5'	ApiI, BspBI, CflI, MhaAI, Pfl21I, PstI, SalPI, Sst12I, YenI
Psp1406I		Pseudomonas pseudoalcaligenes RFL1406	5' AACGTT; 3' TTGCAA	5' ---AA CGTT--- 3'; 3' ---TTGC AA--- 5'	AclI
PspAI		Pseudomonas sp.	5' CCCGGG; 3' GGGCCC	5' ---C CCGGG--- 3'; 3' ---GGGCC C--- 5'	AhyI, **CfrJ4I**, EaeAI, EclRI, Pac25I, **SmaI**, TspMI, XcyI, XmaI, XmaCI
PspALI		Pseudomonas sp. AL1637	5' CCCGGG; 3' GGGCCC	5' ---CCC GGG--- 3'; 3' ---GGG CCC--- 5'	AhyI, Cfr9I, EaeAI, EclRI, **PspALI**, **SmaI**, TspMI, XcyI, XmaI, XmaCI
Psp124BI		Pseudomonas sp. 124B	5' GAGCTC; 3' CTCGAG	5' ---GAGCT C--- 3'; 3' ---C TCGAG--- 5'
PspCI		Pseudomonas sp. C	5' CACGTG; 3' GTGCAC	5' ---CAC GTG--- 3'; 3' ---GTG CAC--- 5'	AcvI, BcoAI, BbrPI, Eco72I, PmaCI, PmlI
PspEI		Pseudomonas sp. E	5' GGTNACC; 3' CCANTGG	5' ---G GTNACC--- 3'; 3' ---CCANTG G--- 5'	AcrII, AspAI, BstEII, BstPI, Eci125I, Eco91I, EcoO65I, EcoO128I
PspGI	3BM3	Pyrococcus sp. GI-H	5' CCWGG; 3' GGWCC	5' --- CCWGG--- 3'; 3' ---GGWCC --- 5'	**AeuI**, AjnI, **AorI**, **Bse17I**, EcoRII, **Fsp1604I**, Psp6I, SspAI, **Sth117I**
PspLI		Pseudomonas sp. L	5' CGTACG; 3' GCATGC	5' ---C GTACG--- 3'; 3' ---GCATG C--- 5'
PspN4I		Pseudomonas sp. N4	5' GGNNCC; 3' CCNNGG	5' ---GGN NCC--- 3'; 3' ---CCN NGG--- 5'	AspNI, BscBI, / BmiI, / BspLI, NlaIV
PspOMI		Pseudomonas sp. OM2164	5' GGGCCC; 3' CCCGGG	5' ---G GGCCC--- 3'; 3' ---CCCGG G--- 5'	**ApaI**, Bsp120I, **PpeI**
PspPI		Psychrobacter immobilis TA137	5' GGNCC; 3' CCNGG	5' ---G GNCC--- 3'; 3' ---CCNG G--- 5'	AsuI, Bal228I, BavBII, BsiZI, BspF4I, Cfr13I, Nsp7121I, Sau96I
PspPPI		Pseudomonas sp. PP	5' RGGWCCY; 3' YCCWGGR	5' ---RG GWCCY--- 3'; 3' ---YCCWG GR--- 5'
PspXI		Pseudomonas sp. A1-1	5' VCTCGAGB; 3' BGAGCTCV	5' ---VC TCGAGB--- 3'; 3' ---BGAGCT CV--- 5'
PsrI		Pseudomonas stutzeri N2	5' GAACN_{6}TAC; 3' CTTGN_{6}ATG	5' ---GAACN_{6}TACN_{6}NNNNNN --- 3'; 3' ---CTTGN_{6}ATGN_{6}N NNNNN--- 5'
PssI		Pseudomonas sp.	5' RGGNCCY; 3' YCCNGGR	5' ---RGGNC CY--- 3'; 3' ---YC CNGGR--- 5'
PstI		Providencia stuartii 164	5' CTGCAG; 3' GACGTC	5' ---CTGCA G--- 3'; 3' ---G ACGTC--- 5'	AliAJI, BspBI, CfuII, Ecl2zI, HalII, PstI, Sag16I, Sag23I, Sst12I, XcpI
PstNHI		Pseudomonas stutzeri NH	5' GCTAGC; 3' CGATCG	5' ---G CTAGC--- 3'; 3' ---CGATC G--- 5'	**AceII**, AsuNHI, **BmtI**, / **BspOI**, NheI, LlaG2I
PsuI		Pseudomonas stutzeri Mck 28-pH52	5' RGATCY; 3' YCTAGR	5' ---R GATCY--- 3'; 3' ---YCTAG R--- 5'
Psu161I		Pseudomonas stutzeri 161	5' CGATCG; 3' GCTAGC	5' ---CGAT CG--- 3'; 3' ---GC TAGC--- 5'	Afa16RI, BspCI, EagBI, MvrI, Ple19I, PvuI, RshI, XorII
PsuAI		Phormidium subfuscum	5' YACGTR; 3' RTGCAY	5' ---YAC GTR--- 3'; 3' ---RTG CAY--- 5'
PsyI		Pseudomonas syringae Lki 1-pH124	5' GACNNNGTC; 3' CTGNNNCAG	5' ---GACN NNGTC--- 3'; 3' ---CTGNN NCAG--- 5'	AspI, AtsI, PflFI, TelI, Tth111I
PtaI		Phormidium tadzschicicum	5' TCCGGA; 3' AGGCCT	5' ---T CCGGA--- 3'; 3' ---AGGCC T--- 5'	Aor13HI, BlfI, BseAI, Bsp13I, BspEI, Kpn2I, PinBII, PtaI
Pun14627I		Phormidium uncinatum 1462/7	5' TGCGCA; 3' ACGCGT	5' ---TGC GCA--- 3'; 3' ---ACG CGT--- 5'	Acc16I, AosI, AviII, FdiII, FspI, MstI, NsbI, PamI
Pun14627II		Phormidium uncinatum 1462/7	5' CAGCTG; 3' GTCGAC	5' ---CAG CTG--- 3'; 3' ---GTC GAC--- 5'
PunAI		Phormidium uncinatum	5' CYCGRG; 3' GRGCYC	5' ---C YCGRG--- 3'; 3' ---GRGCY C--- 5'	AquI, BcoI, BsiHKCI, BspLU4I, Eco27kI, **Nli3877I**, PlaAI
PunAII		Phormidium uncinatum	5' RCATGY; 3' YGTACR	5' ---RCATG Y--- 3'; 3' ---Y GTACR--- 5'
PvuI		Proteus vulgaris	5' CGATCG; 3' GCTAGC	5' ---CGAT CG--- 3'; 3' ---GC TAGC--- 5'	Afa22MI, BspCI, ErhB9I, NblI, Ple19I, Psu161I, RshI, XorII
PvuII	1PVU	Proteus vulgaris	5' CAGCTG; 3' GTCGAC	5' ---CAG CTG--- 3'; 3' ---GTC GAC--- 5'
Pvu84II		Proteus vulgaris 84	5' CAGCTG; 3' GTCGAC	5' ---CAG CTG--- 3'; 3' ---GTC GAC--- 5'

=== R ===
**Enzyme**	**PDB code**	Source	**Recognition sequence**	**Cut**	**Isoschizomers**
RalF40I		Ruminococcus albus F-40	5' GATC; 3' CTAG	5' --- GATC--- 3'; 3' ---CTAG --- 5'	BscFI, BspAI, BstENII, **ChaI**, HacI, MkrAI, Sau3AI, SsiAI
RcaI		Rhodococcus capsulatum	5' TCATGA; 3' AGTACT	5' ---T CATGA--- 3'; 3' ---AGTAC T--- 5'
RflFI		Ruminococcus flavefaciens FD-1	5' GTCGAC; 3' CAGCTG	5' ---G TCGAC--- 3'; 3' ---CAGCT G--- 5'
RflFII		Ruminococcus flavefaciens FD-1	5' AGTACT; 3' TCATGA	5' ---AGT ACT--- 3'; 3' ---TCA TGA--- 5'	Acc113I, AssI, / BmcAI, Bpa34I, DpaI, Eco255I, ScaI, ZrmI
RleAI		Rhizobium leguminosarum	5' CCCACA; 3' GGGTGT	5' ---CCCACAN_{8}NNNN --- 3'; 3' ---GGGTGTN_{8}N NNN--- 5'
RmaI		Rhodothermus marinus	5' CTAG; 3' GATC	5' ---C TAG--- 3'; 3' ---GAT C--- 5'
Rme21I		Rhizobium meliloti	5' ATCGAT; 3' TAGCTA	5' ---AT CGAT--- 3'; 3' ---TAGC TA--- 5'	BanIII, BbvAII, BliRI, BscI, BspJI, BstNZ169I, ClaI, LcaI, Ssp27144I
RsaI		Rhodopseudomonas sphaeroides	5' GTAC; 3' CATG	5' ---GT AC--- 3'; 3' ---CA TG--- 5'	AfaI, **Csp6I**, **CviQI**, **CviRII**, HpyBI, **PabI**, PlaAII, / **RsaNI**,
RshI		Rhodopseudomonas sphaeroides 2.4.1	5' CGATCG; 3' GCTAGC	5' ---CGAT CG--- 3'; 3' ---GC TAGC--- 5'	Afa16RI, BspCI, EagBI, MvrI, Ple19I, Psu161I, PvuI, XorII
RspLKI		Rhodococcus sp. LK2	5' GCATGC; 3' CGTACG	5' ---GCATG C--- 3'; 3' ---C GTACG--- 5'
RspLKII		Rhodococcus sp. LK2	5' GGATCC; 3' CCTAGG	5' ---G GATCC--- 3'; 3' ---CCTAG G--- 5'	AliI, AsiI, BamHI, Bce751I, Nsp29132II, OkrAI, RspLKII, SolI
RspXI		Rhodococcus sp.	5' TCATGA; 3' AGTACT	5' ---T CATGA--- 3'; 3' ---AGTAC T--- 5'
RsrI		Rhodopseudomonas sphaeroides	5' GAATTC; 3' CTTAAG	5' ---G AATTC--- 3'; 3' ---CTTAA G--- 5'
RsrII		Rhodopseudomonas sphaeroides	5' CGGWCCG; 3' GCCWGGC	5' ---CG GWCCG--- 3'; 3' ---GCCWG GC--- 5'
Rsr2I		Rhodobacter sphaeroides SE-I2	5' CGGWCCG; 3' GCCWGGC	5' ---CG GWCCG--- 3'; 3' ---GCCWG GC--- 5'
RtrI		Rhizobium trifolii	5' GTCGAC; 3' CAGCTG	5' ---G TCGAC--- 3'; 3' ---CAGCT G--- 5'
Rtr63I		Rhizobium trifolii 63	5' GTCGAC; 3' CAGCTG	5' ---G TCGAC--- 3'; 3' ---CAGCT G--- 5'
