= Psychrobacter raelei =

Scientific classification
- Domain: Bacteria
- Kingdom: Pseudomonadati
- Phylum: Pseudomonadota
- Class: Gammaproteobacteria
- Order: Pseudomonadales
- Family: Moraxellaceae
- Genus: Psychrobacter
- Species: P. raelei

Binomial name
- Psychrobacter raelei Manzulli et al. 2024

Type strain
- CIP 111873; LMG 32233; PraFG1

Species of bacterium

Psychrobacter raelei is a gram-negative, strictly aerobic bacterium of the genus Psychrobacter, which was isolated from a dog with peritonitis.

The genetic analysis of the original strain (isolated by D. Raele, hence the species' name) placed it in a phylogenetic cluster along with Psychrobacter sanguinis, Psychrobacter piechaudii, and Psychrobacter phenylpyruvicus. This was based upon phylogenetic analyses of the nucleotide sequences of 16S and 23S rRNA genes and of gyrB, Psychrobacter raelei was assigned to the genus Psychrobacter. The chromosomal nucleotide sequence revealed an average nucleotide identity (ANI) of 72.1%, 77.7%, and 77.5 % similarity to Psychrobacter sanguinis, another species in the genus Psychrobacter. The bacterium proves to be halotolerant, growing between 4 and 37 °C; it is oxidase-positive and catalase-positive; it is able to produce indole, to reduce nitrate and to use different carbon sources but 5-keto-d-gluconic acid.
