= Henriciella algicola =

Scientific classification
- Domain: Bacteria
- Kingdom: Pseudomonadati
- Phylum: Pseudomonadota
- Class: Alphaproteobacteria
- Order: Caulobacterales
- Family: Hyphomonadaceae
- Genus: Henriciella
- Species: H. algicola

Binomial name
- Henriciella algicola Abraham et al. 2017

Type strain
- MCS27T

Species of bacterium

Henriciella algicola is a Gram-negative, aerobic and heterotrophic bacterium from the genus Henriciella which has been isolated from seawater.
