= Psychrobacter frigidicola =

Scientific classification
- Domain: Bacteria
- Kingdom: Pseudomonadati
- Phylum: Pseudomonadota
- Class: Gammaproteobacteria
- Order: Pseudomonadales
- Family: Moraxellaceae
- Genus: Psychrobacter
- Species: P. frigidicola

Binomial name
- Psychrobacter frigidicola Bowman et al. 1996

Type strain
- ACAM 304, ATCC 700361, CCM 4737, CCUG 34377, CECT 5937, CIP 10501, CIP 105101, DSM 12411, LMG 21281, NCIMB 13661

Species of bacterium

Psychrobacter frigidicola is a psychrophilic, oxidase-positive, halotolerant, Gram-negative, nonmotile bacterium of the genus Psychrobacter which was isolated from the Antarctic.
