= Henriciella litoralis =

Scientific classification
- Domain: Bacteria
- Kingdom: Pseudomonadati
- Phylum: Pseudomonadota
- Class: Alphaproteobacteria
- Order: Caulobacterales
- Family: Hyphomonadaceae
- Genus: Henriciella
- Species: H. litoralis

Binomial name
- Henriciella litoralis Lee et al. 2011

Species of bacterium

Henriciella litoralis is a Gram-negative, strictly aerobic and non-spore-formin bacterium from the genus Henriciella which has been isolated from tidal flat from the Yellow Sea.
