= Algimonas porphyrae =

Scientific classification
- Domain: Bacteria
- Kingdom: Pseudomonadati
- Phylum: Pseudomonadota
- Class: Alphaproteobacteria
- Order: Caulobacterales
- Family: Hyphomonadaceae
- Genus: Algimonas
- Species: A. porphyrae

Binomial name
- Algimonas porphyrae Fukui et al. 2013

Type strain
- 0C-2-2

Species of bacterium

Algimonas porphyrae is a Gram-negative bacterium from the genus of Algimonas which has been isolated from the alga Porphyra yezoensis.
