= Litorimonas haliclonae =

Scientific classification
- Domain: Bacteria
- Kingdom: Pseudomonadati
- Phylum: Pseudomonadota
- Class: Alphaproteobacteria
- Order: Caulobacterales
- Family: Hyphomonadaceae
- Genus: Litorimonas
- Species: L. haliclonae

Binomial name
- Litorimonas haliclonae Schellenberg et al. 2018

Type strain
- MAA42

Species of bacterium

Litorimonas haliclonae is a Gram-negative, rod-shaped and motile bacterium from the genus of Litorimonas which has been isolated from the sponge Haliclona.
