= Psychrobacter proteolyticus =

Scientific classification
- Domain: Bacteria
- Kingdom: Pseudomonadati
- Phylum: Pseudomonadota
- Class: Gammaproteobacteria
- Order: Pseudomonadales
- Family: Moraxellaceae
- Genus: Psychrobacter
- Species: P. proteolyticus

Binomial name
- Psychrobacter proteolyticus Denner et al. 2001

Type strain
- CIP 106830, Denner 116, DSM 13887, LMG 21313

Species of bacterium

Psychrobacter proteolyticus is a species of bacteria first isolated from the Antarctic krill Euphausia superba. It excretes a cold-adapted metalloprotease. It is a strictly aerobic, strongly oxidase-positive, psychrotrophic, halotolerant, Gram-negative nonmotile coccobacillus; its type strain is CIP106830^{T} (=DSM13887).
