= Ponticaulis koreensis =

Scientific classification
- Domain: Bacteria
- Kingdom: Pseudomonadati
- Phylum: Pseudomonadota
- Class: Alphaproteobacteria
- Order: Caulobacterales
- Family: Hyphomonadaceae
- Genus: Ponticaulis
- Species: P. koreensis

Binomial name
- Ponticaulis koreensis Kang and Lee 2009

Type strain
- GSW-23

Species of bacterium

Ponticaulis koreensis is a Gram-negative, aerobic, obligately halophilic, chemoorganotrophic and motile bacterium from the genus of Ponticaulis which has been isolated from seawater from the coast of Jeju in Korea.
