= Penicillium soppii =

Scientific classification
- Kingdom: Fungi
- Division: Ascomycota
- Class: Eurotiomycetes
- Order: Eurotiales
- Family: Aspergillaceae
- Genus: Penicillium
- Species: P. soppii

Binomial name
- Penicillium soppii Zalessky, K.M. 1927

Type strain
- ATC0 52000, ATCC 10496, ATCC 52000, Biourge 291, CBS 225.28, CBS 226.28, CCF 2773, FRR 0912, FRR 2023, IFO 7766, IMI 040217, KCTC 6266, MUCL 29233, NBRC 7766, NRRL 2023, NRRL 912, QM 1964, Thom 5010.14

Synonyms
- Penicillium matris-meae, Penicillium meleagrinum var. viridiflavum, Penicillium shearii, Penicillium rolfsii var. sclerotiale, Penicillium michaelis

Species of fungus

Penicillium soppii is a psychrotolerant species of fungus in the genus Penicillium which produces cycloaspeptide A.
