= Henriciella marina =

Scientific classification
- Domain: Bacteria
- Kingdom: Pseudomonadati
- Phylum: Pseudomonadota
- Class: Alphaproteobacteria
- Order: Caulobacterales
- Family: Hyphomonadaceae
- Genus: Henriciella
- Species: H. marina

Binomial name
- Henriciella marina Quan et al. 2009

Type strain
- Iso4

Species of bacterium

Henriciella marina is a Gram-negative, strictly aerobic and motile bacterium from the genus Henriciella which has been isolated from the Sea of Japan from Korea.
