= Psychrobacter piscatorii =

Scientific classification
- Domain: Bacteria
- Kingdom: Pseudomonadati
- Phylum: Pseudomonadota
- Class: Gammaproteobacteria
- Order: Pseudomonadales
- Family: Moraxellaceae
- Genus: Psychrobacter
- Species: P. piscatorii

Binomial name
- Psychrobacter piscatorii Yumoto et al. 2010

Type strain
- JCM 15603, NCIMB 14510, T-3-2

Species of bacterium

Psychrobacter piscatorii is a Gram-negative, catalase- and oxidase-positive, psychrotolerant, nonmotile bacterium of the genus Psychrobacter, which was isolated from a fish-processing plant. The temperature where Psychrobacter piscatorii was isolated was about 8 °C.
