= Psychrobacter submarinus =

Scientific classification
- Domain: Bacteria
- Kingdom: Pseudomonadati
- Phylum: Pseudomonadota
- Class: Gammaproteobacteria
- Order: Pseudomonadales
- Family: Moraxellaceae
- Genus: Psychrobacter
- Species: P. submarinus

Binomial name
- Psychrobacter submarinus Romanenko et al. 2002

Type strain
- CIP 107641, DSM 14161, KCTC 12175, KMM 225

Species of bacterium

Psychrobacter submarinus is a Gram-negative, oxidase- and catalase-positive, psychrophilic, halophilic nonmotile aerobic bacterium of the genus Psychrobacter, which was isolated from seawater at a depth of 300 m from the Pacific Ocean.
