= Psychrobacter pacificensis =

Scientific classification
- Domain: Bacteria
- Kingdom: Pseudomonadati
- Phylum: Pseudomonadota
- Class: Gammaproteobacteria
- Order: Pseudomonadales
- Family: Moraxellaceae
- Genus: Psychrobacter
- Species: P. pacificensis

Binomial name
- Psychrobacter pacificensis Maruyama et al. 2000

Type strain
- IFO 16270, NBRC 103191, NIBH P2K6

Species of bacterium

Psychrobacter pacificensis is a Gram-negative, aerobic, non-spore-forming, catalase- and oxidase-positive, psychrophilic, nonmotile bacterium of the genus Psychrobacter, which was isolated from 6000-m-deep seawater of the Japan Trench on the Hachijo Island in Japan.
