= Psychrobacter fozii =

Scientific classification
- Domain: Bacteria
- Kingdom: Pseudomonadati
- Phylum: Pseudomonadota
- Class: Gammaproteobacteria
- Order: Pseudomonadales
- Family: Moraxellaceae
- Genus: Psychrobacter
- Species: P. fozii

Binomial name
- Psychrobacter fozii Bozal et al. 2003

Type strain
- AJ 430827, CECT 5889, CIP 108125, Guinea NF23, LMG 21280

Species of bacterium

Psychrobacter fozii is a psychrophilic, oxidase-positive, halotolerant, Gram-negative, nonmotile coccobacillus with a strictly oxidative metabolism, first isolated from Antarctic environments. Its type strain is NF23T (=LMG 21280T =CECT 5889T).
