= Psychrobacter okhotskensis =

Scientific classification
- Domain: Bacteria
- Kingdom: Pseudomonadati
- Phylum: Pseudomonadota
- Class: Gammaproteobacteria
- Order: Pseudomonadales
- Family: Moraxellaceae
- Genus: Psychrobacter
- Species: P. okhotskensis

Binomial name
- Psychrobacter okhotskensis Yumoto et al. 2003

Type strain
- CCM 7308, CIP 108221, JCM 11840, MD17, NCIMB 13931

Species of bacterium

Psychrobacter okhotskensis is a Gram-negative, catalase- and oxidase-positive, aerobic, facultatively psychrophilic, nonmotile bacterium of the genus Psychrobacter, which was isolated from seawater of the Monbetsu coast of the Okhotsk Sea in Hokkaido in Japan.
