= Litorimonas cladophorae =

Scientific classification
- Domain: Bacteria
- Kingdom: Pseudomonadati
- Phylum: Pseudomonadota
- Class: Alphaproteobacteria
- Order: Caulobacterales
- Family: Hyphomonadaceae
- Genus: Litorimonas
- Species: L. cladophorae

Binomial name
- Litorimonas cladophorae Nedashkovskaya et al. 2013

Type strain
- KMM 6395

Species of bacterium

Litorimonas cladophorae is a Gram-negative, strictly aerobic and rod-shaped bacterium from the genus of Litorimonas which has been isolated from the alga Cladophora stimpsoni.
