= Psychrobacter aquaticus =

Scientific classification
- Domain: Bacteria
- Kingdom: Pseudomonadati
- Phylum: Pseudomonadota
- Class: Gammaproteobacteria
- Order: Pseudomonadales
- Family: Moraxellaceae
- Genus: Psychrobacter
- Species: P. aquaticus

Binomial name
- Psychrobacter aquaticus Shivaji et al. 2005

Type strain
- CIP 108799, CMS 56, DSM 15339, MTCC 4386

Species of bacterium

Psychrobacter aquaticus is a Gram-negative, psychrophilic, halotolerant, nonmotile bacterium of the genus Psychrobacter which was isolated from the McMurdo Dry Valley region of Antarctica.
