= Penicillium cavernicola =

Scientific classification
- Domain: Eukaryota
- Kingdom: Fungi
- Division: Ascomycota
- Class: Eurotiomycetes
- Order: Eurotiales
- Family: Aspergillaceae
- Genus: Penicillium
- Species: P. cavernicola

Binomial name
- Penicillium cavernicola Frisvad & Samson 2004

Synonyms
- Penicillium crustosum var. spinulosporum

Species of fungus

Penicillium cavernicola is a psychrotolerant fungus species of the genus of Penicillium which is found in cool caves.

== See also ==
- List of Penicillium species
