= Henriciella aquimarina =

Scientific classification
- Domain: Bacteria
- Kingdom: Pseudomonadati
- Phylum: Pseudomonadota
- Class: Alphaproteobacteria
- Order: Caulobacterales
- Family: Hyphomonadaceae
- Genus: Henriciella
- Species: H. aquimarina

Binomial name
- Henriciella aquimarina Lee et al. 2011

Type strain
- P38

Synonyms
- Maribaculum marinum Pseudohyphomonas marina

Species of bacterium

Henriciella aquimarina is a bacterium from the genus Henriciella which has been isolated from deep seawater from the Indian Ocean.
