= Psychrobacter marincola =

Scientific classification
- Domain: Bacteria
- Kingdom: Pseudomonadati
- Phylum: Pseudomonadota
- Class: Gammaproteobacteria
- Order: Pseudomonadales
- Family: Moraxellaceae
- Genus: Psychrobacter
- Species: P. marincola

Binomial name
- Psychrobacter marincola Romanenko et al. 2002

Type strain
- CIP 107640, DSM 14160, KMM 277

Species of bacterium

Psychrobacter marincola is a Gram-negative, psychrophilic, moderately halophilic, aerobic oxidase- and catalase-positive, non-pigmented non-spore-forming, nonmotile bacterium of the genus Psychrobacter, which was isolated from the Indian Ocean.
