= Algimonas arctica =

Scientific classification
- Domain: Bacteria
- Kingdom: Pseudomonadati
- Phylum: Pseudomonadota
- Class: Alphaproteobacteria
- Order: Caulobacterales
- Family: Hyphomonadaceae
- Genus: Algimonas
- Species: A. arctica

Binomial name
- Algimonas arctica Liu et al. 2015

Type strain
- SM1216T

Species of bacterium

Algimonas arctica is a Gram-negative and aerobic bacterium from the genus of Algimonas which has been isolated from sand from the Arctic.
