= Psychrobacter vallis =

Scientific classification
- Domain: Bacteria
- Kingdom: Pseudomonadati
- Phylum: Pseudomonadota
- Class: Gammaproteobacteria
- Order: Pseudomonadales
- Family: Moraxellaceae
- Genus: Psychrobacter
- Species: P. vallis

Binomial name
- Psychrobacter vallis Shivaji et al. 2005

Type strain
- CMS 39, DSM 15337, MTCC 4208

Species of bacterium

Psychrobacter vallis is a Gram-negative, psychrophilic, halotolerant, nonmotile bacterium of the genus Psychrobacter, which was isolated from cyanobacterial mat samples from the McMurdo Dry Valley region of Antarctica.
