= Hibernation factor =

Protein used in bacterial dormancy

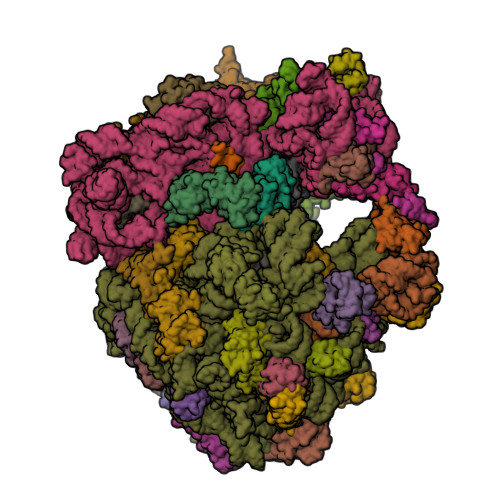
The structure of a Psychrobacter urativorans ribosome in a complex with the hibernation factors Balon and RaiA

A hibernation factor is a protein used by cells to induce a dormant state by slowing or halting the cellular metabolism. This can occur during periods of stress, randomly in order to allocate "designated survivors" in a population, or when bacteria cease growth (enter stationary phase). Hibernation factors can do a variety of things, including dismantling cellular machinery and halting gene expression, but the most important hibernation factors bind to the ribosome and halt protein production, which consumes a large fraction of the energy in a cell.

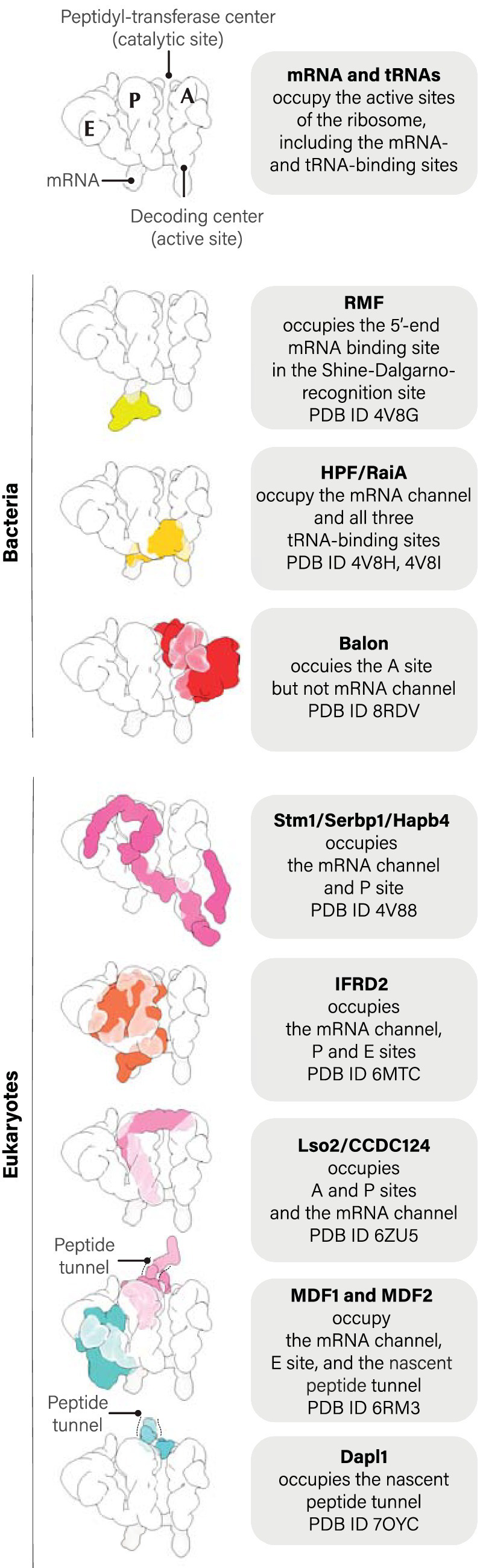
How different hibernation factors bind to the ribosome's active sites

== Ribosome hibernation ==
Ribosome hibernation occurs when ribosome hibernation factors bind to the ribosome and halt protein production. Ribosome hibernation is almost ubiquitous in bacteria, as well as in the plastids of plants, and may also be present in eukaryotes. Ribosome hibernation factors can simply inactivate ribosomes (RaiA, Balon), link pairs into inactive dimers called 100S ribosomes (RMF and HPF), or interfere at various stages of the translation cycle (RsfS, YqjD, SRA, and EttA). One indicator of ribosome hibernation is the presence of a large number of 100S ribosomes, which can constitute up to 60% of the ribosomes in a cell at a time.

=== RMF, RaiA, and HPF ===
Three proteins, RMF, RaiA, and HPF, are only found in the large class of bacteria gammaproteobacteria. RMF (Ribosome modulation factor) is a small protein, typically produced under nutrient starvation and stress conditions, that is the main factor in the formation of 100S ribosomes. During the formation process, RMF binds together 70S (standard) ribosomes to form 90S ribosome dimers. These 90S dimers are converted by HPF (hibernation promoting factor) to form mature 100S dimers. A third protein, RaiA (ribosome-associated inhibitor A) is thought to both inactivate 70S ribosomes alone and stabilize them, preventing them from being converted into 100S ribosomes. Most non-gammaproteobacteria, as well as some plant plastids, instead contain a HPF homologue that can form 100S ribosomes by itself.

=== Balon ===
Balon (Spanish "ball", after homologue Pelota) is a hibernation factor protein found in the cold-adapted bacterium Psychrobacter urativorans. The protein was discovered accidentally by a researcher who unintentionally left a sample of P. urativorans in an ice bucket for too long, cold-shocking it, through subsequent cryo-EM scans of the organism's ribosomes. Unlike other factors, Balon can bind to the ribosome while protein production is in process. This is important for rapid response to stress because in some cells, protein production can take up to 20 minutes to complete. Balon does this by rather than physically blocking the A site of the ribosome, as other hibernation factors do, binding near to but not across the channel, allowing it to attach to the ribosome independent of whether protein production is taking place. Genetic relatives of Balon have been found in 20% of bacterial genomes catalogued in public databases, but are absent from Escherichia coli and Staphylococcus aureus, the most widely used models for cellular dormancy.

=== RsfS ===
RsfS (Ribosome silencing factor S) inhibits translation by preventing the 30S and 50S subunits of the ribosome from binding to each other again after they split during ribosome recycling. It has also been suggested to be a ribosome biogenesis factor rather than a hibernation factor.

=== SRA ===
SRA (Stationary-phase-induced Ribosome-Associated protein) is not well understood as of 2018. It is a small protein of 45 amino acids and is tightly associated with the 30S ribosomal subunit. It increases from an average of 0.1 molecules per ribosome to 0.4 per ribosome during the transition to stationary phase and remains so for several days.

=== YqjD ===
YqjD is an inner membrane protein specific to stationary phase. It binds to 70S and 100S ribosomes and has been proposed as of 2018 to mediate the localization (moving) of hibernating ribosomes to the cell membrane. While cells lacking YqjD do not have altered growth rates of ribosome composition, artificially high levels of it quickly halts growth depending on the protein's ribosome-binding capability.

=== EttA ===
EttA (Energy-dependent translational throttle A) is an ATP-binding protein of the ABC-F family which is thought to modulate translation rate based on the energy level of a cell. When ADP (degraded ATP, indicating low energy) levels are high, the protein inhibits ribosome activity, allowing translation at high ATP levels. EttA interferes specifically after the formation of the first peptide bond in the new protein and before the first translocation step induced by EF-G.
