= Henriciella pelagia =

Scientific classification
- Domain: Bacteria
- Kingdom: Pseudomonadati
- Phylum: Pseudomonadota
- Class: Alphaproteobacteria
- Order: Caulobacterales
- Family: Hyphomonadaceae
- Genus: Henriciella
- Species: H. pelagia

Binomial name
- Henriciella pelagia Wu et al. 2017

Type strain
- LA220

Species of bacterium

Henriciella pelagia is a Gram-negative, aerobic, short-rod-shaped and motile bacterium from the genus Henriciella which has been isolated from seawater from the Eastern Pacific Ocean.
