= Litorimonas taeanensis =

Scientific classification
- Domain: Bacteria
- Kingdom: Pseudomonadati
- Phylum: Pseudomonadota
- Class: Alphaproteobacteria
- Order: Caulobacterales
- Family: Hyphomonadaceae
- Genus: Litorimonas
- Species: L. taeanensis

Binomial name
- Litorimonas taeanensis Jung et al. 2011

Type strain
- G5

Species of bacterium

Litorimonas taeanensis is a Gram-negative, aerobic and heterotrophic bacterium from the genus of Litorimonas which has been isolated from the beach of Taean in Korea.
