= Ponticaulis profundi =

Scientific classification
- Domain: Bacteria
- Kingdom: Pseudomonadati
- Phylum: Pseudomonadota
- Class: Alphaproteobacteria
- Order: Caulobacterales
- Family: Hyphomonadaceae
- Genus: Ponticaulis
- Species: P. profundi

Binomial name
- Ponticaulis profundi Sun et al. 2018

Type strain
- YC239

Species of bacterium

Ponticaulis profundi is a Gram-negative, strictly aerobic, rod-shaped and motile bacterium from the genus of Ponticaulis which has been isolated from a seamount near the Yap Trench.
