= Luti =

Luti may refer to:

- Luti Fagbenle, British actor and businessman
- Benedetto Luti (1666–1724), Italian painter
- Margarita Luti (fl. 16th century), mistress and model of Raphael
- William J. Luti, American Senior Director for the National Security Council
- Psychrobacter luti, a species of bacterium first isolated from Antarctic environments
- Luti people, a group of outcast in Iran
