= Algimonas ampicilliniresistens =

Scientific classification
- Domain: Bacteria
- Kingdom: Pseudomonadati
- Phylum: Pseudomonadota
- Class: Alphaproteobacteria
- Order: Caulobacterales
- Family: Hyphomonadaceae
- Genus: Algimonas
- Species: A. ampicilliniresistens

Binomial name
- Algimonas ampicilliniresistens Fukui et al. 2013

Species of bacterium

Algimonas ampicilliniresistens is a Gram-negative, prosthecate and motile bacterium from the genus of Algimonas which has been isolated from the alga Porphyra yezoensis.
