= Psychrobacter arenosus =

Scientific classification
- Domain: Bacteria
- Kingdom: Pseudomonadati
- Phylum: Pseudomonadota
- Class: Gammaproteobacteria
- Order: Pseudomonadales
- Family: Moraxellaceae
- Genus: Psychrobacter
- Species: P. arenosus

Binomial name
- Psychrobacter arenosus Romanenko et al. 2004

Type strain
- CIP 109036, DSM 15389, KMM 3659, R-7

Species of bacterium

Psychrobacter arenosus is a Gram-negative, psychrotolerant, aerobic, nonmotile bacterium of the genus Psychrobacter, which was isolated from coastal sea ice and sediment samples of the Sea of Japan.
