= Psychrobacter aquimaris =

Scientific classification
- Domain: Bacteria
- Kingdom: Pseudomonadati
- Phylum: Pseudomonadota
- Class: Gammaproteobacteria
- Order: Pseudomonadales
- Family: Moraxellaceae
- Genus: Psychrobacter
- Species: P. aquimaris

Binomial name
- Psychrobacter aquimaris Yoon et al. 2005

Type strain
- CIP 108795, DSM 16329, KCTC 12254, SW-210

Species of bacterium

Psychrobacter aquimaris is a Gram-negative, non-spore-forming, nonmotile bacterium of the genus Psychrobacter which was isolated from the South Sea in Korea.
