= Litorimonas =

Scientific classification
- Domain: Bacteria
- Kingdom: Pseudomonadati
- Phylum: Pseudomonadota
- Class: Alphaproteobacteria
- Order: Caulobacterales
- Family: Hyphomonadaceae
- Genus: Litorimonas; Jung et al. 2011

Species
- L. cladophorae L. haliclonae L. taeanensis

Genus of bacteria

Litorimonas is a genus of bacteria from the family of Hyphomonadaceae.
