= Psychrobacter nivimaris =

Scientific classification
- Domain: Bacteria
- Kingdom: Pseudomonadati
- Phylum: Pseudomonadota
- Class: Gammaproteobacteria
- Order: Pseudomonadales
- Family: Moraxellaceae
- Genus: Psychrobacter
- Species: P. nivimaris

Binomial name
- Psychrobacter nivimaris Heuchert et al. 2004

Type strain
- 88/2-7, CIP 108514, DSM 16093, NCIMB 13982

Species of bacterium

Psychrobacter nivimaris is a Gram-negative, oxidase- and catalase-positive, aerobic, nonmotile bacterium of the genus Psychrobacter, isolated from the Southern Ocean.
