= Psychrobacter glaciei =

Scientific classification
- Domain: Bacteria
- Kingdom: Pseudomonadati
- Phylum: Pseudomonadota
- Class: Gammaproteobacteria
- Order: Pseudomonadales
- Family: Moraxellaceae
- Genus: Psychrobacter
- Species: P. glaciei

Binomial name
- Psychrobacter glaciei Zeng et al. 2016

Type strain
- CCTCC AB 2014019, KCTC 42280, BIc20019

Species of bacterium

Psychrobacter glaciei is a Gram-negative, non-spore-forming and non-motile bacterium of the genus Psychrobacter which has been isolated from the ice core of an arctic glacier from Austre Lovénbreen in Svalbard.
