= Psychrobacter luti =

Scientific classification
- Domain: Bacteria
- Kingdom: Pseudomonadati
- Phylum: Pseudomonadota
- Class: Gammaproteobacteria
- Order: Pseudomonadales
- Family: Moraxellaceae
- Genus: Psychrobacter
- Species: P. luti

Binomial name
- Psychrobacter luti Bozal et al. 2003

Type strain
- CECT 5885, CIP 108124, Guinea NF11, LMG 21276

Species of bacterium

Psychrobacter luti is a species of bacterium first isolated from Antarctic environments. It is a psychrophilic, oxidase-positive, halotolerant, Gram-negative, nonmotile coccobacillus with a strictly oxidative metabolism. Its type strain is NF11T (=LMG 21276T =CECT 5885T).
