= Psychrobacter =

Scientific classification
- Domain: Bacteria
- Kingdom: Pseudomonadati
- Phylum: Pseudomonadota
- Class: Gammaproteobacteria
- Order: Pseudomonadales
- Family: Moraxellaceae
- Genus: Psychrobacter; Juni and Heym 1986

Type species
- Psychrobacter immobilis

Species
- See text.

Genus of bacteria

Psychrobacter is a genus of Gram-negative, osmotolerant, oxidase-positive, psychrophilic or psychrotolerant, aerobic bacteria which belong to the family Moraxellaceae and the class Gammaproteobacteria. The shape is typically cocci or coccobacilli. Some of those bacteria were isolated from humans and can cause humans infections such as endocarditis and peritonitis. This genus of bacteria is able to grow at temperatures between −10 and 42 °C. Rudi Rossau found through DNA-rRNA hybridization analysis that Psychrobacter belongs to the Moraxellaceae. The first species (Psychrobacter immobilis) was described by Juni and Heym. Psychrobacter occur in wide range of moist, cold saline habitats, but they also occur in warm and slightly saline habitats.

Hypoacylated lipopolysaccharide (LPS) isolated from Psychrobacter cryohalolentis and Psychrobacter arcticus induces moderate TLR4-mediated inflammatory response in macrophages and such LPS bioactivity may potentially result in the failure of local and systemic bacterial clearance in patients.

Species include:

- Psychrobacter adeliensis
- Psychrobacter aestuarii
- Psychrobacter alimentarius
- Psychrobacter aquaticus
- Psychrobacter aquimaris
- Psychrobacter arcticus
- Psychrobacter arenosus
- Psychrobacter celer
- Psychrobacter cibarius
- Psychrobacter ciconiae
- Psychrobacter communis
- Psychrobacter cryohalolentis
- Psychrobacter faecalis
- Psychrobacter fjordensis
- Psychrobacter fozii
- Psychrobacter frigidicola
- Psychrobacter fulvigenes
- Psychrobacter glaciei
- Psychrobacter glacincola
- Psychrobacter halodurans
- Psychrobacter immobilis
- Psychrobacter jeotgali
- Psychrobacter luti
- Psychrobacter lutiphocae
- Psychrobacter marincola
- Psychrobacter maritimus
- Psychrobacter namhaensis
- Psychrobacter nivimaris
- Psychrobacter oceani
- Psychrobacter okhotskensis
- Psychrobacter pacificensis
- Psychrobacter pasteurii
- Psychrobacter phenylpyruvicus
- Psychrobacter piechaudii
- Psychrobacter piscatorii
- Psychrobacter pocilloporae
- Psychrobacter proteolyticus
- Psychrobacter pygoscelis
- Psychrobacter pulmonis
- Psychrobacter raelei
- Psychrobacter saeujeotis
- Psychrobacter salsus
- Psychrobacter sanguinis
- Psychrobacter submarinus
- Psychrobacter SC65A.3
- Psychrobacter urativorans
- Psychrobacter vallis
