= Psychrobacter pocilloporae =

Scientific classification
- Domain: Bacteria
- Kingdom: Pseudomonadati
- Phylum: Pseudomonadota
- Class: Gammaproteobacteria
- Order: Pseudomonadales
- Family: Moraxellaceae
- Genus: Psychrobacter
- Species: P. pocilloporae

Binomial name
- Psychrobacter pocilloporae Zachariah et al. 2016

Type strain
- JCM 31058, LMG 29157, S6-60

Species of bacterium

Psychrobacter pocilloporae is a Gram-negative, rod-shaped and aerobic bacterium of the genus Psychrobacter which has been isolated from the coral Pocillopora eydouxi from the Andaman Sea in India.
