= Hellea =

Scientific classification
- Domain: Bacteria
- Kingdom: Pseudomonadati
- Phylum: Pseudomonadota
- Class: Alphaproteobacteria
- Order: Caulobacterales
- Family: Hyphomonadaceae
- Genus: Hellea; Alain et al. 2008

Species
- H. balneolensis

Genus of bacteria

Hellea is a Gram-negative, aerobic and heterotrophic genus of bacteria from the family of Hyphomonadaceae with only one known species (Hellea balneolensis).
