= Psychrobacter ciconiae =

Scientific classification
- Domain: Bacteria
- Kingdom: Pseudomonadati
- Phylum: Pseudomonadota
- Class: Gammaproteobacteria
- Order: Pseudomonadales
- Family: Moraxellaceae
- Genus: Psychrobacter
- Species: P. ciconiae

Binomial name
- Psychrobacter ciconiae Kämpfer et al. 2015

Type strain
- CCM 8519, CIP 110777, LMG 28175, 176/10, 178/10, 182/10, 185/7, 193/8

Species of bacterium

Psychrobacter ciconiae is a Gram-negative, rod-shaped bacterium of the genus Psychrobacter, which was isolated from the stork Ciconia ciconia.
