= Psychrobacter pygoscelis =

Scientific classification
- Domain: Bacteria
- Kingdom: Pseudomonadati
- Phylum: Pseudomonadota
- Class: Gammaproteobacteria
- Order: Pseudomonadales
- Family: Moraxellaceae
- Genus: Psychrobacter
- Species: P. pygoscelis

Binomial name
- Psychrobacter pygoscelis Kämpfer et al. 2020

Type strain
- I-STPP5b

Species of bacterium

Psychrobacter pygoscelis is a Gram-negative and rod-shaped bacterium from the genus Psychrobacter which has been isolated from the trachea of a penguin (Pygoscelis papua) from the Fildes Bay.
