= Psychrobacter alimentarius =

Scientific classification
- Domain: Bacteria
- Kingdom: Pseudomonadati
- Phylum: Pseudomonadota
- Class: Gammaproteobacteria
- Order: Pseudomonadales
- Family: Moraxellaceae
- Genus: Psychrobacter
- Species: P. alimentarius

Binomial name
- Psychrobacter alimentarius ShivaYoon et al. 2005

Type strain
- DSM 16065, JCM 12315, JG-100, KCTC 12186

Species of bacterium

Psychrobacter alimentarius is a Gram-negative, non-spore-forming, nonmotile bacterium of the genus Psychrobacter which was isolated from squid jeotgal, a traditional Korean fermented seafood, in South Korea
