= Psychrobacter salsus =

Scientific classification
- Domain: Bacteria
- Kingdom: Pseudomonadati
- Phylum: Pseudomonadota
- Class: Gammaproteobacteria
- Order: Pseudomonadales
- Family: Moraxellaceae
- Genus: Psychrobacter
- Species: P. salsus

Binomial name
- Psychrobacter salsus Shivaji et al. 2005

Type strain
- CIP 109038, DD 48, DSM 15338, MTCC 4826

Species of bacterium

Psychrobacter salsus is a gram-negative, strictly aerobic bacterium of the genus Psychrobacter, which was isolated from the fast ice in the middle of Géologie Archipelago in Adélie Land in Antarctica.
