= Psychrobacter adeliensis =

Scientific classification
- Domain: Bacteria
- Kingdom: Pseudomonadati
- Phylum: Pseudomonadota
- Class: Gammaproteobacteria
- Order: Pseudomonadales
- Family: Moraxellaceae
- Genus: Psychrobacter
- Species: P. adeliensis

Binomial name
- Psychrobacter adeliensis Shivaji et al. 2005

Type strain
- CIP 109037, DSM 15333, MTCC 4825, SJ 14

Species of bacterium

Psychrobacter adeliensis is a gram-negative bacterium of the genus Psychrobacter which was isolated from fast Ice in the middle of the Géologie Archipelago in Adélie Land in Antarctica.
