= Psychrobacter namhaensis =

Scientific classification
- Domain: Bacteria
- Kingdom: Pseudomonadati
- Phylum: Pseudomonadota
- Class: Gammaproteobacteria
- Order: Pseudomonadales
- Family: Moraxellaceae
- Genus: Psychrobacter
- Species: P. namhaensis

Binomial name
- Psychrobacter namhaensis Yoon et al. 2005

Type strain
- CIP 108796, DSM 16330, KCTC 12255, SW-242

Species of bacterium

Psychrobacter namhaensis is a Gram-negative, aerobic, non-spore-forming, slightly halophilic bacterium of the genus Psychrobacter, which was isolated from the South Sea in Korea.
