= Psychrobacter jeotgali =

Scientific classification
- Domain: Bacteria
- Kingdom: Pseudomonadati
- Phylum: Pseudomonadota
- Class: Gammaproteobacteria
- Order: Pseudomonadales
- Family: Moraxellaceae
- Genus: Psychrobacter
- Species: P. jeotgali

Binomial name
- Psychrobacter jeotgali Yoon et al. 2003

Species of bacterium

Psychrobacter jeotgali is a species of bacteria named after jeotgal, a traditional Korean fermented seafood, where it was first isolated. It is a Gram-negative, non-motile, non-spore-forming, and moderately halophilic coccus. The type strain is YKJ-103^{T} (=KCCM 41559^{T} =JCM 11463^{T}).
