= Psychrobacter aestuarii =

Scientific classification
- Domain: Bacteria
- Kingdom: Pseudomonadati
- Phylum: Pseudomonadota
- Class: Gammaproteobacteria
- Order: Pseudomonadales
- Family: Moraxellaceae
- Genus: Psychrobacter
- Species: P. aestuarii

Binomial name
- Psychrobacter aestuarii Baik et al. 2010

Type strain
- JCM 16343, KCTC 22503, SC35

Species of bacterium

Psychrobacter aestuarii is a Gram-negative, strictly aerobic, non-spore-forming, nonmotile bacterium of the genus Psychrobacter which was isolated from tidal flat sediment in the South Sea in Korea.
