= Psychrobacter immobilis =

Scientific classification
- Domain: Bacteria
- Kingdom: Pseudomonadati
- Phylum: Pseudomonadota
- Class: Gammaproteobacteria
- Order: Pseudomonadales
- Family: Moraxellaceae
- Genus: Psychrobacter
- Species: P. immobilis

Binomial name
- Psychrobacter immobilis Juni and Heym 1986

Type strain
- strain A351, NBRC 15733, LMG 7203, JCM 20442, IFO 15733, DSM 7229, CIP 102557, CCUG 9708, ATCC 43116

Species of bacterium

Psychrobacter immobilis is a Gram-negative, oxidase- and catalase-positive, psychrotrophic, nonmotile bacterium of the genus Psychrobacter which was isolated from cheese, fish, and processed meat and poultry products.
