= Robiginitomaculum =

Scientific classification
- Domain: Bacteria
- Kingdom: Pseudomonadati
- Phylum: Pseudomonadota
- Class: Alphaproteobacteria
- Order: Caulobacterales
- Family: Hyphomonadaceae
- Genus: Robiginitomaculum; Lee et al. 2007

Species
- R. antarcticum

Genus of bacteria

Robiginitomaculum is a Gram-negative, chemoheterotrophic, strictly aerobic and non-motile genus of bacteria from the family of Hyphomonadaceae with one known species (Robiginitomaculum antarcticum).
