= Psychrobacter cibarius =

Scientific classification
- Domain: Bacteria
- Kingdom: Pseudomonadati
- Phylum: Pseudomonadota
- Class: Gammaproteobacteria
- Order: Pseudomonadales
- Family: Moraxellaceae
- Genus: Psychrobacter
- Species: P. cibarius

Binomial name
- Psychrobacter cibarius Jung et al. 2005

Type strain
- CIP 108733, DSM 16327, JG-219, KCTC 12256

Species of bacterium

Psychrobacter cibarius is a Gram-negative, nonmotile bacterium of the genus Psychrobacter, which was isolated from jeotgal in Korea.
