= Psychrobacter maritimus =

Scientific classification
- Domain: Bacteria
- Kingdom: Pseudomonadati
- Phylum: Pseudomonadota
- Class: Gammaproteobacteria
- Order: Pseudomonadales
- Family: Moraxellaceae
- Genus: Psychrobacter
- Species: P. maritimus

Binomial name
- Psychrobacter maritimus Romanenko et al. 2004

Type strain
- CIP 108811, DSM 15387, KMM 3646, Pi2-20

Species of bacterium

Psychrobacter maritimus is a Gram-negative, aerobic oxidase- and catalase-positive, nonpigmented, non-spore-forming, nonmotile bacterium of the genus Psychrobacter, which was isolated from coastal sea ice and sediments of the Sea of Japan and in Russia.
