= Phormidium aerugineo-caeruleum =

Scientific classification
- Domain: Bacteria
- Phylum: Cyanobacteria
- Class: Cyanophyceae
- Order: Oscillatoriales
- Family: Oscillatoriaceae
- Genus: Phormidium
- Species: P. aerugineo-caeruleum

Binomial name
- Phormidium aerugineo-caeruleum Anagn. & Komárek (Gomont)

Species of cyanobacteria

Phormidium aerugineo-caeruleum is a species of cyanobacteria in the genus Phormidium.
