= Ponticaulis =

Scientific classification
- Domain: Bacteria
- Kingdom: Pseudomonadati
- Phylum: Pseudomonadota
- Class: Alphaproteobacteria
- Order: Caulobacterales
- Family: Hyphomonadaceae
- Genus: Ponticaulis; Kang and Lee 2009

Species
- P. koreensis P. profundi

Genus of bacteria

Ponticaulis is a genus of bacteria from the family of Hyphomonadaceae.
