= Henriciella =

Scientific classification
- Domain: Bacteria
- Kingdom: Pseudomonadati
- Phylum: Pseudomonadota
- Class: Alphaproteobacteria
- Order: Caulobacterales
- Family: Hyphomonadaceae
- Genus: Henriciella; Quan et al. 2009

Species
- H. algicola Abraham et al. 2017; H. aquimarina Lee et al. 2011; H. barbarensis Abraham et al. 2017; H. litoralis Lee et al. 2011; H. marina Quan et al. 2009; H. pelagia Wu et al. 2017

Synonyms
- Maribaculum Lai et al. 2009

Genus of bacteria

Henriciella is a genus of bacteria from the family Hyphomonadaceae. Henriciella is named after the American microbiologist Arthur T. Henrici.
