= Pathogenic microorganisms in frozen environments =

Pathogens which may re-emerge as ancient ice/permafrost is lost

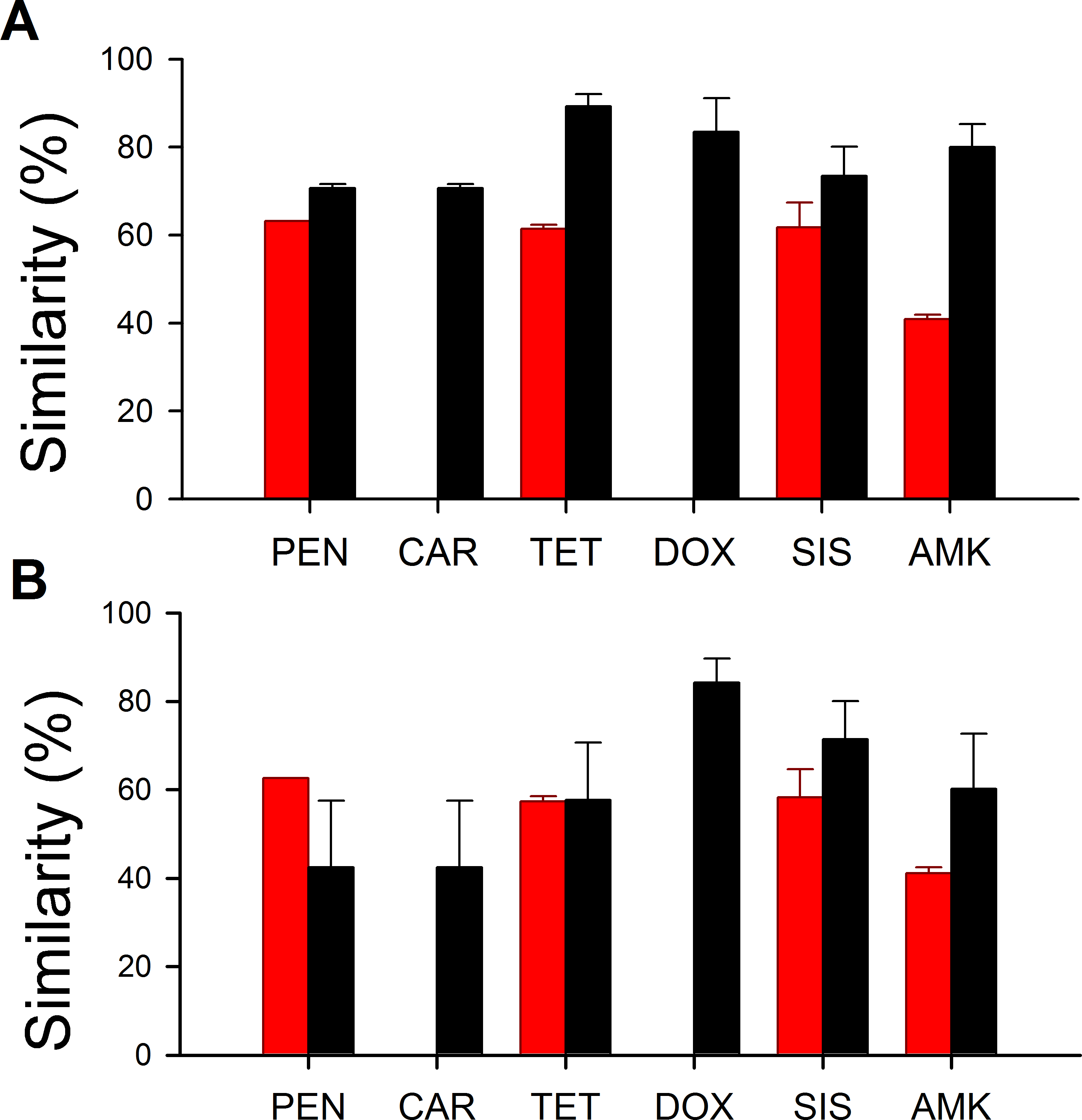
Ancient bacteria found in the permafrost possess a remarkable range of antibiotic resistance genes (red). However, their capacity to resist is also generally lower than of modern bacteria from the same area (black).

On Earth, frozen environments such as permafrost and glaciers are known for their ability to preserve items, as they are too cold for ordinary decomposition to take place. This makes them a valuable source of archeological artefacts and prehistoric fossils, yet it also means that there are certain risks once ancient organic matter is finally subject to thaw. The best-studied risk is that of decomposition of such organic matter releasing a substantial quantity of carbon dioxide and methane, and thus acting as a notable climate change feedback. Yet, some scientists have also raised concerns about the possibility that some metabolically dormant bacteria and protists, as well as always metabolically inactive viruses, may both survive the thaw and either threaten humans directly, or affect some of the animal or plant species important for human wellbeing.

As of 2023, there has been at least one recorded reemergence of anthrax, a pathogen long-known for its ability to hibernate in soils. There have also been several cases when truly novel microorganisms discovered in the frozen environments were successfully revived by researchers, or were found live in a recently thawed environment. So far, most only affect amoebas, and none have been known to pose a risk to humans or to crops. Of the already-studied pathogens, at least one anthrax outbreak has been connected to decades-old infected carrion thaw; yet, samples of influenza and smallpox pathogens have failed to survive the thaw even in laboratory conditions. Some researchers have also raised alarm about the potential of horizontal gene transfer between ancient and modern bacteria, and the risk it could exacerbate the challenge of antibiotic resistance. At the same time, other scientists consider these concerns overblown, and argue that ancient microorganisms are unlikely to make a difference today.

== Timeline of research into the subject ==
=== 20th century ===
Johan Hultin made multiple attempts during the 20th century to culture 1918 influenza virus he found in the frozen corpses of pandemic victims at Brevig Mission in Alaska. Every attempt failed, which suggested that the influenza virus is incapable of surviving the thaw after being frozen. In the 1990s, other scientists have tried to revive pneumonia-causing bacteria and the smallpox virus, yet all of those attempts were unsuccessful as well.

=== 1999 ===
A group of researchers was able to extract potentially viable microscopic fungi, as well as the RNA of tomato mosaic virus, from Greenland ice cores up to 140,000 years old.

=== 2004 ===
It was estimated that between 10^{17} and 10^{21} microorganisms, ranging from fungi and bacteria in addition to viruses, were already released every year due to ice melt, often directly into the ocean. According to researchers behind this estimate, only viruses with high abundance, ability to be transported through ice, and ability to resume disease cycles after the thaw would be of any concern.

In particular, caliciviruses of Vesivirus genus were hypothesized as the most likely to spread from ancient ice, due to their high abundance and using ocean animals as hosts, where the migratory nature of many species of fish and birds could potentially enable a high transmission rate. Caliciviruses are poorly adapted to humans, and the only known infections were of marine biologists who worked closely with infected seals. However, Enteroviruses (a group which includes polioviruses, echoviruses and Coxsackie viruses) and even influenza A were also considered less likely but still plausible candidates.

=== 2005 ===
In the 1960s, the United States Army Corps of Engineers had dug out Fox tunnel in Alaska, to provide a good test ground to better understand permafrost before the construction of the Trans-Alaska Pipeline System. By 2005, scientists revisiting that tunnel have discovered frozen cells of carnobacterium pleistocenium, with an estimated age of 32,000 years. Melting the ice had revived them, resulting in the first documented case of an organism "coming back to life" from ancient ice. None of the bacteria in carnobacterium genus are known to be pathogenic in humans, although some are known for spoiling chilled food products, and one species may cause disease in fish.

=== 2011 ===
A paper by two Russian scientists in Global Health Action, a journal published by Umeå University in Sweden, had warned of the risk that the old burial grounds of cattle which had died to anthrax in the early last century may thaw and lead to the re-emergence of the viable pathogen. The authors noted that at the time, there were about 13,885 cattle burial grounds in Northern Russia, a substantial fraction of which did not meet sanitary standards, and some had their maps or other records missing.

=== 2014 ===
A completely unknown plant virus was revived from a frozen caribou feces deposit which was only 700 years old. It was named "ancient caribou feces associated virus" (aCFV) by its discoverers. The scientists have also introduced this virus into the tissues of Nicotiana benthamiana, a common model species for plant pathogens. aCFV had successfully replicated, yet was unable to cause more than an asymptomatic infection. According to the researchers, this either suggests a large genetic distance between the original host species of aCFV and more modern plants, or that N. benthamiana was simply a suboptimal host for this species.

Also in 2014, two ~30,000 years old giant virus species, Pithovirus sibericum and Mollivirus sibericum, were discovered in the Siberian permafrost and they retained their infectivity. Like the other giant viruses with large genomes, they are larger in size than most bacteria and pose no risk to humans, as they infect other microorganisms like Acanthamoeba, a genus of amoebas.

=== 2016 ===
An anthrax outbreak had occurred in the Yamal Peninsula region in Northern Russia. It was thought to be linked to an infected reindeer corpse, which died 75 years earlier, yet had thawed after a heatwave. Over 2,000 reindeer had been infected and the disease had spread to humans, hospitalizing dozens and killing a child before the outbreak was contained.

=== 2023 ===
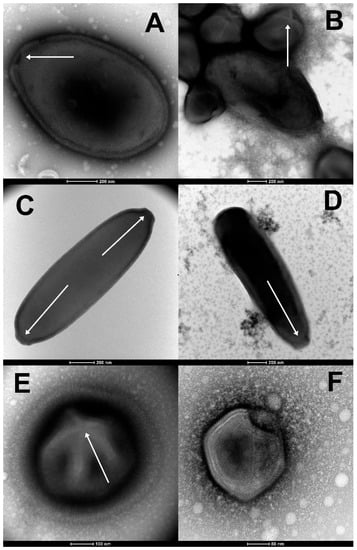
Some of the ancient amoeba-eating viruses revived by the research team of Jean-Michel Claverie. Clockwise from the top: Pandoravirus yedoma; Pandoravirus mammoth and Megavirus mammoth; Cedratvirus lena; Pithovirus mammoth; Megavirus mammoth; Pacmanvirus lupus.

The same team of French researchers behind the 2014 revival of two giant viruses had also managed to revive 8 more ancient amoeba-infecting viral species. Four of these species were from the pandoravirus, cedratvirus (sometimes classified as a subgroup of pithovirus), megavirus and pacmanvirus (part of Asfarviridae) families, which weren't previously revived from the permafrost. In addition, five more species from these families were found in already thawed permafrost, with no way to tell their age. The oldest revived virus was a 48,500-year-old Pandoravirus yedoma.

== Current scientific understanding ==
Scientists are split on whether revived microorganisms from the permafrost can pose a significant threat to humans. Jean-Michel Claverie, who led the most successful attempts to revive such "zombie viruses", believes that the public health threat from them is underestimated, and that while his research focused on amoeba-infecting viruses, this decision was in part motivated by the desire to avoid viral spillover as well as convenience, and "one can reasonably infer" other viral species would also remain infectious. Another professor, Birgitta Evengård, argued that permafrost thaw would eventually uncover microorganisms older than the human species, and to which there would be no preexisting immunity. In the same interview, Claverie had even suggested that ancient microorganisms might have had caused or contributed to the extinction of Neanderthals or mammoths, and that those may still be preserved in the permafrost. On the other hand, University of British Columbia virologist Curtis Suttle argued that "people already inhale thousands of viruses every day, and swallow billions whenever they swim in the sea". In his view, the odds of a frozen virus replicating and then circulating to a sufficient extent to threaten humans "stretches scientific rationality to the breaking point".

While some point to the 2016 Yamal Peninsula outbreak as an example of dangers associated with the thaw, others argue that anthrax is not a pathogen which can spread contagiously between humans, and that it has been known for its ability to remain dormant in the soil since the Middle Ages, without requiring the cold to do so. Some scientists have argued that Hultin's inability to revive thawed influenza virus, as well as other researchers' failure to revive pneumonia-causing bacteria or smallpox viruses show that pathogens adapted to warm-blooded hosts cannot survive being frozen for a prolonged period of time. However, many of the amoeba-infecting viruses revived in Claverie's 2023 research were taken from a ~27,000-year-old site with "a large amount of mammoth wool", and one species, Pacmanvirus lupus, was found in the intestine of an equally old Siberian wolf carcass.

There is some agreement that revived bacteria would be less dangerous than the revived viruses, since they would still be affected by broad-spectrum antibiotics and would not require wholly new treatments. However, they would not be completely vulnerable either, due to the discovery of ancient antibiotic resistance genes in permafrost samples. Antibiotics to which permafrost bacteria have displayed at least some resistance include chloramphenicol, streptomycin, kanamycin, gentamicin, tetracycline, spectinomycin and neomycin. Some scientists consider horizontal gene transfer of novel antibiotic resistance sequences from otherwise harmless ancient bacteria into modern pathogens to be a far more realistic threat than a revival of an ancient pathogen. At the same time, other studies show that resistance levels in ancient bacteria to modern antibiotics remain lower than in the contemporary bacteria from the active (thawed) layer above them, suggesting that this risk is "no greater" than in any other soil.

According to a 2023 interview with Marion Koopmans, the head of the Netherlands' Versatile Emerging infectious disease Observatory (VEO), precautions taken by the researchers studying potentially risky sites in Greenland include not starting new digs and only analyizing the locations which were already going to be studied by archeologists, wearing protective gear while in the field, and operating under high BSL standards in the lab. If a place was found to harbour a potentially dangerous microorganism, they have the authority to advise the Naalakkersuisut to shut down access to the area.

== See also ==
- Psychrophile
- Antibiotic resistance
