= Psychrobacter cryohalolentis =

Scientific classification
- Domain: Bacteria
- Kingdom: Pseudomonadati
- Phylum: Pseudomonadota
- Class: Gammaproteobacteria
- Order: Pseudomonadales
- Family: Moraxellaceae
- Genus: Psychrobacter
- Species: P. cryohalolentis

Binomial name
- Psychrobacter cryohalolentis Bakermans et al. 2007

Species of bacterium

Psychrobacter cryohalolentis is a Gram-negative, nonmotile, aerobic species of bacteria. It was first isolated from Siberian permafrost. Its type strain is K5^{T} (=DSM 17306^{T} =VKM B-2378^{T}).

Hypoacylated lipopolysaccharide (LPS) from P. cryohalolentis induces moderate TLR4-mediated inflammatory response in macrophages and such LPS bioactivity may potentially result in the failure of local and systemic bacterial clearance in patients.

P. cryohaloentis has an optimum growth temperature of 22 °C. The species requires 10 mM of NaCl for growth and can tolerate a salinity of as high as 1.25 M NaCl. Cells are catalase and oxidase positive.
