= Psychrobacter celer =

Scientific classification
- Domain: Bacteria
- Kingdom: Pseudomonadati
- Phylum: Pseudomonadota
- Class: Gammaproteobacteria
- Order: Pseudomonadales
- Family: Moraxellaceae
- Genus: Psychrobacter
- Species: P. celer

Binomial name
- Psychrobacter celer Yoon et al. 2005

Type strain
- CIP 109014, JCM 12601, KCTC 12313, SW-238

Species of bacterium

Psychrobacter celer is a Gram-negative, slightly halophilic, non-spore-forming, nonmotile bacterium of the genus Psychrobacter, which was isolated from the South Sea in Korea.
