= Hirschia =

Scientific classification
- Domain: Bacteria
- Kingdom: Pseudomonadati
- Phylum: Pseudomonadota
- Class: Alphaproteobacteria
- Order: Caulobacterales
- Family: Hyphomonadaceae
- Genus: Hirschia; Schlesner et al. 1990

Species
- Hirschia baltica; Hirschia litorea; Hirschia maritima

Genus of bacteria

Hirschia is a genus of bacteria in the family Hyphomonadaceae.
