= Psychrobacter oceani =

Scientific classification
- Domain: Bacteria
- Kingdom: Pseudomonadati
- Phylum: Pseudomonadota
- Class: Gammaproteobacteria
- Order: Pseudomonadales
- Family: Moraxellaceae
- Genus: Psychrobacter
- Species: P. oceani

Binomial name
- Psychrobacter oceani Matsuyama et al. 2015

Type strain
- JCM 30235, NCIMB 14948, 4k5

Species of bacterium

Psychrobacter oceani is a Gram-negative, strictly aerobic and nonmotile bacterium of the genus Psychrobacter, which was isolated from a sample of marine sediment from the Pacific Ocean.
