= Psychrobacter pasteurii =

Scientific classification
- Domain: Bacteria
- Kingdom: Pseudomonadati
- Phylum: Pseudomonadota
- Class: Gammaproteobacteria
- Order: Pseudomonadales
- Family: Moraxellaceae
- Genus: Psychrobacter
- Species: P. pasteurii

Binomial name
- Psychrobacter pasteurii Hurtado et al. 2017

Type strain
- CECT 9184, CIP 110853, A1019

Species of bacterium

Psychrobacter pasteurii is a Gram-negative, non-spore-forming and non-motile bacterium of the genus Psychrobacter.
