= Phormidium allorgei =

Scientific classification
- Domain: Bacteria
- Phylum: Cyanobacteria
- Class: Cyanophyceae
- Order: Oscillatoriales
- Family: Oscillatoriaceae
- Genus: Phormidium
- Species: P. allorgei

Binomial name
- Phormidium allorgei Anagn. (Frémy)

Species of cyanobacteria

Phormidium allorgei is a species of cyanobacteria in the genus Phormidium.
