= Asprobacter =

Scientific classification
- Domain: Bacteria
- Kingdom: Pseudomonadati
- Phylum: Pseudomonadota
- Class: Alphaproteobacteria
- Order: Caulobacterales
- Family: Hyphomonadaceae
- Genus: Asprobacter; Jin et al. 2017
- Species: A. aquaticus

Binomial name
- Asprobacter aquaticus Jin et al. 2017

Genus of bacteria

Asprobacter is a Gram-negative and aerobic genus of bacteria from the family of Hyphomonadaceae with one known species, Asprobacter aquaticus. Asprobacter aquaticus has been isolated from fresh water.
