= Psychrobacter faecalis =

Scientific classification
- Domain: Bacteria
- Kingdom: Pseudomonadati
- Phylum: Pseudomonadota
- Class: Gammaproteobacteria
- Order: Pseudomonadales
- Family: Moraxellaceae
- Genus: Psychrobacter
- Species: P. faecalis

Binomial name
- Psychrobacter faecalis Kämpfer et al. 2002

Type strain
- CCUG 48039 CIP 107288; DSM 14664; Iso-46

Psychrobacter faecalis is an aerobic, Gram-negative, oxidase-positive, catalase-positive, non-spore forming bacillus initially isolated from a bioaerosol originating from pigeon faeces.

== Microbiology ==
P. faecalis is an aerobic bacterium formed of Gram negative rods, measuring 0.8-1.2 x 1.0-2.0 μm, which grow in circular, opaque colonies on nutrient agar. It is oxidase-positive, catalase-positive and indole-negative. This organism shows psychrotrophic tendencies and replicates in temperatures ranging from 4 °C to 36 °C, and possesses chemoheterotrophic metabolism.

== Discovery ==
P. faecalis was discovered in 2002, while performing a study analysing the exposure of workers to bioaerosols in a room contaminated with pigeon faeces. An isolate was found that grew on MacConkey agar, but could not be clearly identified as a member of the Enterobacteriaceae. 16S rRNA sequencing identified significant sequence similarities (93.9 - 96.9%) between this new isolate and other members of the Psychrobacter genus, but below 97%, indicating the presence of a novel species.
