= Psychrobacter arcticus =

Scientific classification
- Domain: Bacteria
- Kingdom: Pseudomonadati
- Phylum: Pseudomonadota
- Class: Gammaproteobacteria
- Order: Pseudomonadales
- Family: Moraxellaceae
- Genus: Psychrobacter
- Species: P. arcticus

Binomial name
- Psychrobacter arcticus Bakermans et al. 2007

Species of bacterium

Psychrobacter arcticus is a Gram-negative, nonmotile species of bacteria first isolated from Siberian permafrost. Its type strain is 273-4^{T} (=DSM 17307^{T} =VKM B-2377^{T}).

Hypoacylated lipopolysaccharide (LPS) from P. arcticus induces weak TLR4-mediated inflammatory response in macrophages and such LPS bioactivity may potentially result in the failure of local and systemic bacterial clearance in patients.
