= Fretibacter =

Scientific classification
- Domain: Bacteria
- Kingdom: Pseudomonadati
- Phylum: Pseudomonadota
- Class: Alphaproteobacteria
- Order: Caulobacterales
- Family: Hyphomonadaceae
- Genus: Fretibacter; Cho et al. 2013

Species
- F. rubidus

Genus of bacteria

Fretibacter is a genus of bacteria from the family of Hyphomonadaceae with one known species (Fretibacter rubidus).
