= Psychrobacter glacincola =

Scientific classification
- Domain: Bacteria
- Kingdom: Pseudomonadati
- Phylum: Pseudomonadota
- Class: Gammaproteobacteria
- Order: Pseudomonadales
- Family: Moraxellaceae
- Genus: Psychrobacter
- Species: P. glacincola

Binomial name
- Psychrobacter glacincola Romanenko et al. 2009

Type strain
- ACAM 483, AICVCI, ATCC 700754, CCUG 34874, CECT 5309, CECT 5939, CIP 105313, DSM 12194, LMG 21282

Species of bacterium

Psychrobacter glacincola is a Gram-negative, oxidase- and catalase-positive, halotolerant, nonmotile bacterium of the genus Psychrobacter, which was isolated from the anchor ice of Amery Ice Shelf in Antarctica. It is strictly oxidative and coccus-shaped; its type strain is ACAM 483^{T}.
