= Algimonas =

Scientific classification
- Domain: Bacteria
- Kingdom: Pseudomonadati
- Phylum: Pseudomonadota
- Class: Alphaproteobacteria
- Order: Caulobacterales
- Family: Hyphomonadaceae
- Genus: Algimonas; Fukui et al. 2013

Species
- A. ampicilliniresistens A. arctica A. porphyrae

Genus of bacteria

Algimonas is a genus of bacteria from the family of Hyphomonadaceae. Algimonas occur in marine habitats.
