= Psychrobacter pulmonis =

Scientific classification
- Domain: Bacteria
- Kingdom: Pseudomonadati
- Phylum: Pseudomonadota
- Class: Gammaproteobacteria
- Order: Pseudomonadales
- Family: Moraxellaceae
- Genus: Psychrobacter
- Species: P. pulmonis

Binomial name
- Psychrobacter pulmonis Vela et al. 2003

Type strain
- CCM 7211, CCUG 46240, CECT 5989, CIP 107927, DSM 16214, KCTC 12112, S-606

Species of bacterium

Psychrobacter pulmonis is a Gram-negative, catalase- and oxidase-positive, strictly aerobic, nonmotile bacterium of the genus Psychrobacter, which was isolated from the lungs of lambs in Zaragoza in Spain. It is coccus-shaped; the type strain is S-606T (=CECT 5989T =CCUG 46240T).
