= Phormidium africanum =

Scientific classification
- Domain: Bacteria
- Phylum: Cyanobacteria
- Class: Cyanophyceae
- Order: Oscillatoriales
- Family: Oscillatoriaceae
- Genus: Phormidium
- Species: P. africanum

Binomial name
- Phormidium africanum Lemmermann

Species of cyanobacterium

Phormidium africanum is a species of cyanobacterium in the genus Phormidium.
