= Psychrobacter fulvigenes =

Scientific classification
- Domain: Bacteria
- Kingdom: Pseudomonadati
- Phylum: Pseudomonadota
- Class: Gammaproteobacteria
- Order: Pseudomonadales
- Family: Moraxellaceae
- Genus: Psychrobacter
- Species: P. fulvigenes

Binomial name
- Psychrobacter fulvigenes Romanenko et al. 2009

Type strain
- CIP 110075, JCM 15525, KC 40, KMM 3954, NRIC 0746

Species of bacterium

Psychrobacter fulvigenes is a Gram-negative, oxidase- and catalase-positive, aerobic, non-spore-forming, nonmotile bacterium of the genus Psychrobacter, which was isolated from the Sea of Japan.
