= Psychrobacter lutiphocae =

Scientific classification
- Domain: Bacteria
- Kingdom: Pseudomonadati
- Phylum: Pseudomonadota
- Class: Gammaproteobacteria
- Order: Pseudomonadales
- Family: Moraxellaceae
- Genus: Psychrobacter
- Species: P. lutiphocae

Binomial name
- Psychrobacter lutiphocae Yassin and Busse 2009

Type strain
- CCUG 56590, CIP 110018, DSM 21542, IMMIB L-1110

Species of bacterium

Psychrobacter lutiphocae is a Gram-negative, aerobic oxidase- and catalase-positive, non-spore-forming, nonmotile bacterium of the genus Psychrobacter, which was isolated from the faeces of a seal in Schleswig-Holstein in Germany.
