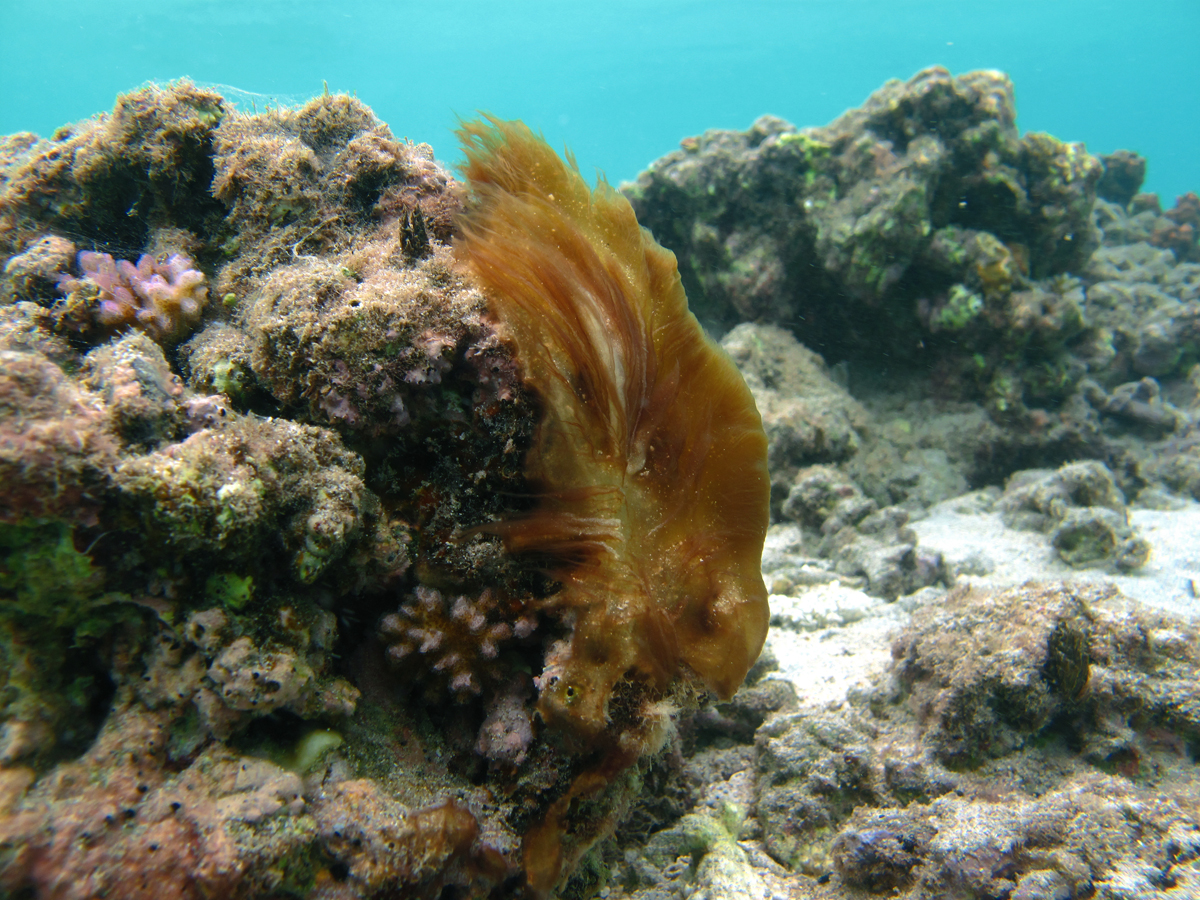

Scientific classification
- Domain: Bacteria
- Kingdom: Bacillati
- Phylum: Cyanobacteriota
- Class: Cyanophyceae
- Order: Oscillatoriales
- Family: Oscillatoriaceae
- Genus: Phormidium; Kützing ex Gomont, 1892

= Phormidium =

Genus of cyanobacteria

Phormidium is a common genus of cyanobacteria with a cosmopolitan distribution. This genus is in the family Oscillatoriaceae. Species in this genus will produce a range of cyanotoxins. Under favorable conditions, Phormidium forms continuous and large mats, which are documented to harbor various species of bacteria or algae.

As a result of recent genetic analyses, several new genera were erected from this genus, e.g. Potamolinea.

== Species ==
83, including

- Phormidium ambiguum
- Phormidium allorgei
- Phormidium aerugineo-caeruleum
- Phormidium lucidum
- Phormidium subfuscum

Moved:

- Phormidium africanum → Leptolyngbya africana
- Phormidium formosum → Kamptonema formosum
