= Psychrobacter urativorans =

Scientific classification
- Domain: Bacteria
- Kingdom: Pseudomonadati
- Phylum: Pseudomonadota
- Class: Gammaproteobacteria
- Order: Pseudomonadales
- Family: Moraxellaceae
- Genus: Psychrobacter
- Species: P. urativorans

Binomial name
- Psychrobacter urativorans Bowman et al. 1996

Type strain
- ATCC 15174, ATCC 11052, ATCC 12226, CCM 900, CCUG 4982, DSM 20429, NCIB 11372, CIP 105100, NCIMB 11372, LMG 21283, DSM 14009, CECT 5938, KCTC 12176

Synonyms
- Micrococcus cryophilus

Species of bacterium

Psychrobacter urativorans is a Gram-negative, aerobic, nonmotile bacterium of the genus Psychrobacter, which was first isolated from frozen package of pork sausage in the 1970s. The species' first recognized publication isolated it from ornithogenic soil (fecal matter of birds) in the Arctic in the 1990s. The name "urativorans" ("uric acid eating") is derived from the Neo-Latin "uratum" (salt of uric acid), and Latin "vorans" (eating or devouring). The species is known to live in Arctic ornithogenic soil, and chilled meat.
