= Pseudomonas alkanolytica =

Scientific classification
- Domain: Bacteria
- Kingdom: Pseudomonadati
- Phylum: Pseudomonadota
- Class: Gammaproteobacteria
- Order: Pseudomonadales
- Family: Pseudomonadaceae
- Genus: Pseudomonas
- Species: P. alkanolytica

Binomial name
- Pseudomonas alkanolytica Nakao and Kuno 1972

Species of bacterium

Pseudomonas alkanolytica is a Gram-negative soil bacterium that produces Coenzyme A. Because this organism is patented, it is not officially recognized as a legitimate Pseudomonas species, and therefore has no type strain. However, it is available through the American Type Culture Collection.
