= Psychrobacter piechaudii =

Scientific classification
- Domain: Bacteria
- Kingdom: Pseudomonadati
- Phylum: Pseudomonadota
- Class: Gammaproteobacteria
- Order: Pseudomonadales
- Family: Moraxellaceae
- Genus: Psychrobacter
- Species: P. piechaudii

Binomial name
- Psychrobacter piechaudii Hurtado et al. 2017

Type strain
- CECT 9185, CIP110854, strain 1232

Species of bacterium

Psychrobacter piechaudii is a Gram-negative, non-spore-forming and on-motile bacterium from the genus of Psychrobacter.
