= Paucimonas =

Scientific classification
- Domain: Bacteria
- Kingdom: Pseudomonadati
- Phylum: Pseudomonadota
- Class: Betaproteobacteria
- Order: Burkholderiales
- Family: Oxalobacteraceae
- Genus: Paucimonas; Jendrossek 2001
- Species: P. lemoignei

Binomial name
- Paucimonas lemoignei (Delafield et al. 1965) Jendrossek 2001

Synonyms
- Pseudomonas lemoignei Delafield et al. 1965

Genus of bacteria

Paucimonas lemoignei, formerly Pseudomonas lemoignei, is a Gram-negative soil bacterium. It is aerobic, motile, and rod-shaped. It is the only species in the genus Paucimonas.

== Basic information ==
Sources:

- Straight to slightly curved rods. Motile by a single polar flagellum. Endospores not found.
- The only known habitat is soil, particularly the rhizosphere, but not associated with plants.
- Obligate aerobic. Chemoorganotrophic. Characterized by restricted metabolism.
- Most strains are able to fix nitrogen.
- Grows between pH 5.5 and 9.0. Optimum temperature is near 30 °C, but no growth is observed above 41 °C.
- Colonies are circular, small, white to beige, and adherent to the agar.

== Taxonomy ==
Paucimonas lemoignei is established by Delafield et al. in 1965, and transferred by Jendrossek in 2001 after reevaluating its 16S rDNA sequence. This is a big shift from one class to another. P. lemoignei is so far the only species under the genus Paucimonas.

"Paucus" means little or few. "Paucimonas" refers to bacterium with restricted catabolic capacities. P. lemoignei is named after the French microbiologist Maurice Lemoigne who first described poly-3-hydroxybutyrate (PHB) as a constituent of bacterial cells.

== Metabolic properties ==
Paucimonas lemoignei are originally isolated from soil rich in poly-3-hydroxybutyrate (PHB). There are only 10 known substrates, mostly organic acids, that can be used for P. lemoignei as a sole carbon source. Sugars, sugar acids, alcohols, polyalcohols, amino acids, polypeptides, and polyols do not support its growth. Preferred carbon sources include: acetate, pyruvate, succinate, butyrate, 3-hydroxybutyrate, valerate and 3-hydroxyvalerate.

== Application ==
Polyhydroxyalkanoates (PHA) are polyesters that can be used to make biodegradable and biocompatible thermoplastics, attracting commercial interests with the growing awareness of sustainability. PHA-degrading bacteria are mainly proteobacteria. (Note: PHB and PHV mentioned above are two types belonging to the PHA family.)

P. lemoignei can encode five kinds of extracellular PHA depolymerase, all of which hydrolyze PHB at high specific activities. It hydrolyzes the 3-hydroxybutyrate dimer with the highest specific activity of any of the enzymes reported so far. In addition, the purified enzymes are remarkably stable and active at high temperature (60 °C), high pH (up to 12.0), low ionic strength (distilled water), and in solvents (e.g. n-propyl alcohol).

The PHA depolymerases of P. lemoignei demonstrate a stable expression and secretion in recombinant Escherichia coli. The processing sites of the precursors in E. coli were the same as that in P. lemoignei, and similar substrate specificities were determined for the wild-type and the recombinant proteins. This lays the foundation for streamlined production of extracellular PHA depolymerases.
