= Psychrobacter phenylpyruvicus =

Scientific classification
- Domain: Bacteria
- Kingdom: Pseudomonadati
- Phylum: Pseudomonadota
- Class: Gammaproteobacteria
- Order: Pseudomonadales
- Family: Moraxellaceae
- Genus: Psychrobacter
- Species: P. phenylpyruvicus

Binomial name
- Psychrobacter phenylpyruvicus Bowman et al. 1996

Type strain
- ACAM 535, ACM 886, ATCC 23333, BCRC 11231, CCM 5954, CCRC 11231, CCUG 351, CDC 2863, CIP 82.27, CIP 82.27T, CNCTC 5749, CNCTC Mo 7/75, DSM 7000, IAM 12282, JCM 20444, LMG 5372, NBRC 102152, NCTC 10526, USCC 1618

Synonyms
- Moraxella polymorpha, Moraxella phenylpyruvica

Species of bacterium

Psychrobacter phenylpyruvicus is a Gram-negative, catalase- and oxidase-positive, nonmotile bacterium of the genus Psychrobacter, which was isolated from human blood in Belgium. Psychrobacter phenylpyruvicus can cause humans infections such as endocarditis, peritonitis, and fungating lesion of the foot, but those infections caused by this bacterium are rare.
