= Pseudomonas alcaligenes =

Scientific classification
- Domain: Bacteria
- Kingdom: Pseudomonadati
- Phylum: Pseudomonadota
- Class: Gammaproteobacteria
- Order: Pseudomonadales
- Family: Pseudomonadaceae
- Genus: Pseudomonas
- Species: P. alcaligenes

Binomial name
- Pseudomonas alcaligenes Monias 1928

Type strain
- ATCC 14909 CCUG 1425 A CFBP 2437; CIP 101034; DSM 50342; JCM 5967; LMG 1224; NBRC 14159; NCCB 76044; NCTC 10367; VKM B-2171

Species of bacterium

Pseudomonas alcaligenes is a Gram-negative aerobic bacterium used for bioremediation purposes of oil pollution, pesticide substances, and certain chemical substances, as it can degrade polycyclic aromatic hydrocarbons. It can be a human pathogen, but occurrences are very rare. Based on 16S rRNA analysis, P. alcaligenes has been placed in the P. aeruginosa group.
