= Hyphomonas =

Scientific classification
- Domain: Bacteria
- Kingdom: Pseudomonadati
- Phylum: Pseudomonadota
- Class: Alphaproteobacteria
- Order: Caulobacterales
- Family: Hyphomonadaceae
- Genus: Hyphomonas (ex Pongratz 1957) Moore et al. 1984

Species
- Hyphomonas adhaerens Weiner et al. 2000; Hyphomonas atlantica corrig. Li et al. 2015; Hyphomonas beringensis Li et al. 2015; Hyphomonas chukchiensis Li et al. 2015; Hyphomonas hirschiana Weiner et al. 1985; Hyphomonas jannaschiana Weiner et al. 1985; Hyphomonas johnsonii Weiner et al. 2000; Hyphomonas neptunium (Leifson 1964) Moore et al. 1984; Hyphomonas oceanitis Weiner et al. 1985; "Hyphomonas pacifica" Li et al. 2016; Hyphomonas polymorpha (ex Pongratz 1957) Moore et al. 1984; Hyphomonas rosenbergii Weiner et al. 2000

Genus of bacteria

Hyphomonas is a genus of bacteria in the family Hyphomonadaceae.
