= Phormidium ambiguum =

Scientific classification
- Domain: Bacteria
- Phylum: Cyanobacteria
- Class: Cyanophyceae
- Order: Oscillatoriales
- Family: Oscillatoriaceae
- Genus: Phormidium
- Species: P. ambiguum

Binomial name
- Phormidium ambiguum Gomont

Species of cyanobacteria

Phormidium ambiguum is a species of cyanobacteria in the genus Phormidium.
