= Psychrobacter sanguinis =

Scientific classification
- Domain: Bacteria
- Kingdom: Pseudomonadati
- Phylum: Pseudomonadota
- Class: Gammaproteobacteria
- Order: Pseudomonadales
- Family: Moraxellaceae
- Genus: Psychrobacter
- Species: P. sanguinis

Binomial name
- Psychrobacter sanguinis Wirth et al. 2012

Type strain
- CCUG 59771, DSM 23635, strain 13983

Species of bacterium

Psychrobacter sanguinis is a Gram-negative, strictly aerobic bacterium of the genus Psychrobacter, which was isolated from human blood in New York.

Psychrobacter species have mainly been isolated from marine environments and cold habitats, such as deep-sea water. They have also been found in various food products, including seafood, poultry, cheese, and meat. Some species are considered rare opportunistic human pathogens, with reported infections affecting areas such as the cerebrospinal fluid, blood, wounds, urinary tract, eyes, ears, brain tissue, and skin. Different species within the genus have been linked to a range of clinical conditions.
