= Pseudomonas mendocina =

Scientific classification
- Domain: Bacteria
- Kingdom: Pseudomonadati
- Phylum: Pseudomonadota
- Class: Gammaproteobacteria
- Order: Pseudomonadales
- Family: Pseudomonadaceae
- Genus: Pseudomonas
- Species: P. mendocina

Binomial name
- Pseudomonas mendocina Palleroni 1970

Type strain
- ATCC 25411 CCUG 1781; CFBP 2434; CIP 75.21; DSM 50017; JCM 5966; LMG 1223; NBRC 14162; NCCB 76043; NCTC 10897; VKM B-972

Species of bacterium

Pseudomonas mendocina is a Gram-negative environmental bacterium that can cause opportunistic infections, such as infective endocarditis and spondylodiscitis, although cases are very rare. It has potential use in bioremediation as it is able to degrade toluene. Based on 16S rRNA analysis, P. mendocina has been placed in the P. aeruginosa group.
