= Hyphomonadaceae =

Scientific classification
- Domain: Bacteria
- Kingdom: Pseudomonadati
- Phylum: Pseudomonadota
- Class: Alphaproteobacteria
- Order: Caulobacterales
- Family: Hyphomonadaceae; Lee et al. 2005

Genera
- Algimonas Fukui et al. 2013; Asprobacter Jin et al. 2017; Fretibacter Cho et al. 2013; Hellea Alain et al. 2008; Henriciella Quan et al. 2009; Hirschia Schlesner et al. 1990; Hyphomonas (ex Pongratz 1957) Moore et al. 1984; Litorimonas Jung et al. 2011; Ponticaulis Kang and Lee 2009; Robiginitomaculum Lee et al. 2007; Thalassorhabdomicrobium Zhao et al. 2019; Vitreimonas Asem et al. 2020

Synonyms
- Robiginitomaculaceae Kevbrin et al. 2021

Family of bacteria

Hyphomonadaceae are a family of bacteria in the order Caulobacterales.
