= Psychrophile =

Organism capable of growing and reproducing in the cold

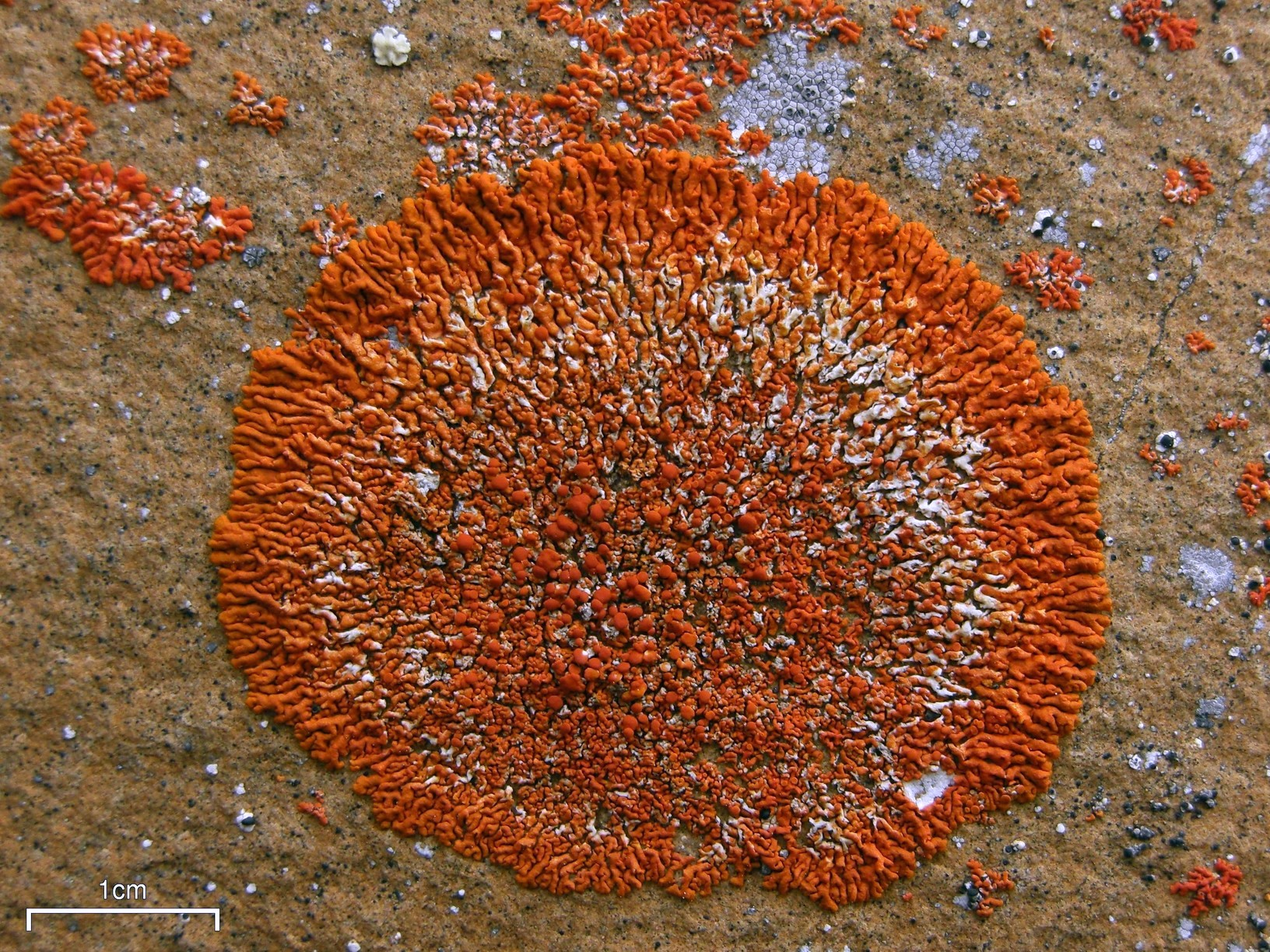
The lichen Xanthoria elegans can continue to photosynthesize at −24 °C (−11 °F).

Psychrophiles /ˈsaɪkroʊˌfaɪl/ or cryophiles (adj. psychrophilic or cryophilic) are extremophilic organisms that are capable of growth and reproduction in low temperatures, ranging from −20 °C (−4 °F) to 20 °C (68 °F). They are found in places that are permanently cold, such as the polar regions and the deep sea. They can be contrasted with thermophiles, which are organisms that thrive at unusually high temperatures, and mesophiles at intermediate temperatures. Psychrophile is Greek for 'cold-loving', from Ancient Greek ψυχρός (psukhrós) 'cold, frozen'.

Many such organisms are bacteria or archaea, but some are eukaryotes such as phytoplankton, and multicellular organisms such as lichens, snow algae, worms, fungi, and wingless midges.

== Biology ==
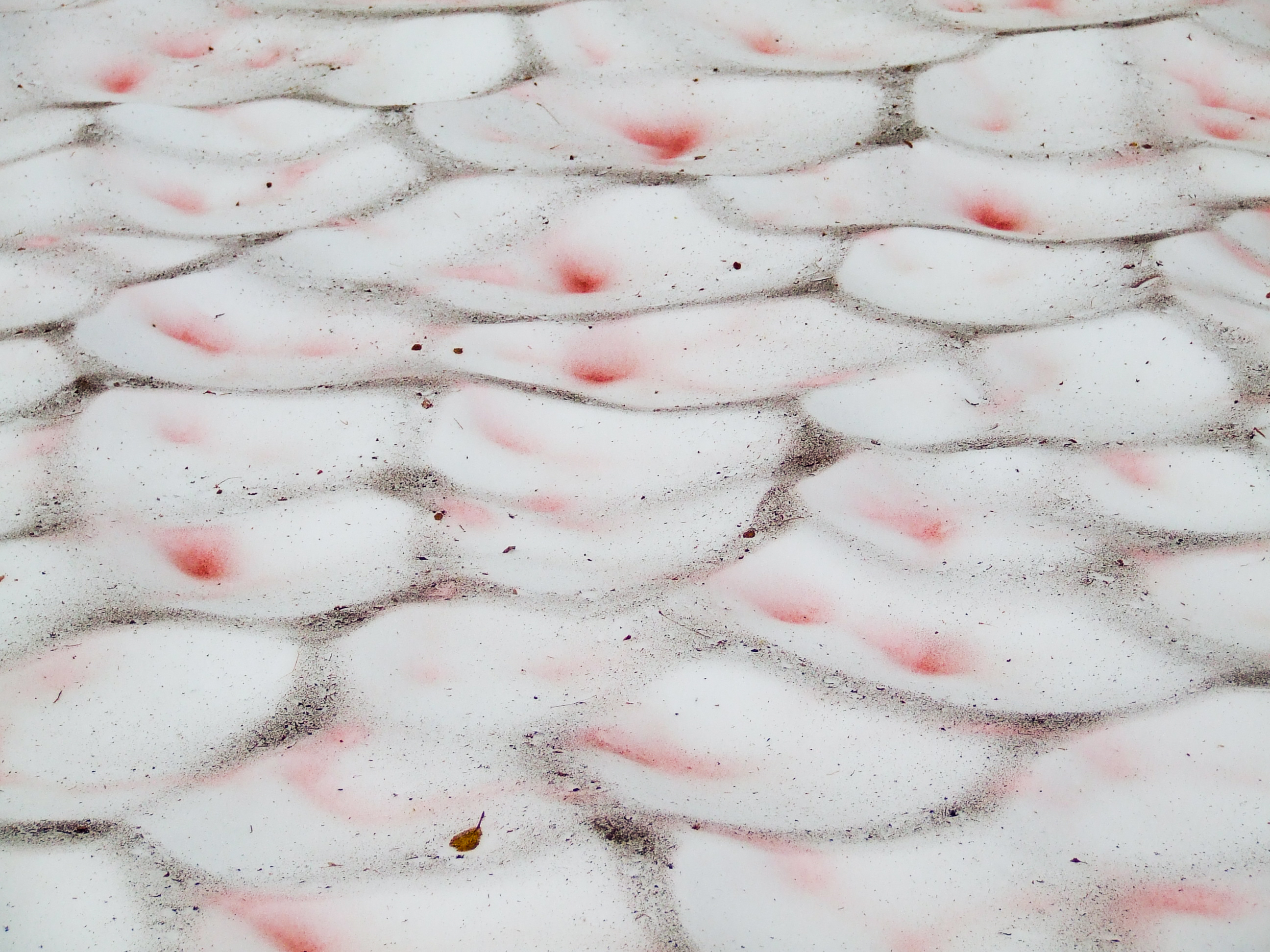
Snow surface with snow algae Chlamydomonas nivalis.

=== Habitat ===
The cold environments that psychrophiles inhabit are ubiquitous on Earth, as a large fraction of the planetary surface experiences temperatures lower than 10 °C (50 °F). They are present in permafrost, polar ice, glaciers, snowfields and deep ocean waters. These organisms can also be found in pockets of sea ice with high salinity content. Microbial activity has been measured in soils frozen below −39 °C (−38 °F). In addition to their temperature limit, psychrophiles must also adapt to other extreme environmental constraints that may arise as a result of their habitat. These constraints include high pressure in the deep sea, and high salt concentration on some sea ice.

=== Adaptations ===
Psychrophiles are protected from freezing and the expansion of ice by ice-induced desiccation and vitrification (glass transition), as long as they cool slowly. Free living cells desiccate and vitrify between −10 and −26 °C (14 and −15 °F). Cells of multicellular organisms may vitrify at temperatures below −50 °C (−58 °F). The cells may continue to have some metabolic activity in the extracellular fluid down to these temperatures, and they remain viable once restored to normal temperatures.

They must also overcome the stiffening of their lipid cell membrane, as this is important for the survival and functionality of these organisms. To accomplish this, psychrophiles adapt lipid membrane structures that have a high content of short, unsaturated fatty acids. Compared to longer saturated fatty acids, incorporating this type of fatty acid allows for the lipid cell membrane to have a lower melting point, which increases the fluidity of the membranes. This adaptation helps maintain proper membrane function in cold environments by preventing rigidity and ensuring that essential cellular processes can continue efficiently. In addition, carotenoids are present in the membrane, which help modulate the fluidity of it.

Antifreeze proteins are also synthesized to keep psychrophiles' internal space liquid, and to protect their DNA when temperatures drop below water's freezing point. By doing so, the protein prevents any ice formation or recrystallization process from occurring.

The enzymes of these organisms have been hypothesized to engage in an activity-stability-flexibility relationship as a method for adapting to the cold; the flexibility of their enzyme structure will increase as a way to compensate for the freezing effect of their environment.

Cold adapted enzymes produced by psychrophiles exhibit high catalytic efficiency at low temperatures but reduced thermal stability, allowing metabolic processes to occur efficiently in cold environments

Certain cryophiles, such as Gram-negative bacteria Vibrio and Aeromonas spp., can transition into a viable but nonculturable (VBNC) state. During VBNC, a micro-organism can respire and use substrates for metabolism – however, it cannot replicate. An advantage of this state is that it is highly reversible. It has been debated whether VBNC is an active survival strategy or if eventually the organism's cells will no longer be able to be revived. There is proof however it may be very effective – Gram positive bacteria Actinobacteria have been shown to have lived about 500,000 years in the permafrost conditions of Antarctica, Canada, and Siberia. Due to their ability to retain their enzymes at low temperatures, psychrophilic microorganisms are being examined to find biotechnological and industrial applications, such as food processing, detergents, pharmaceuticals, and environment bioremediation.

=== Taxonomic range ===
Psychrophiles include bacteria, lichens, snow algae, phytoplankton, fungi, and insects.

Among the bacteria that can tolerate extreme cold are Arthrobacter sp., Psychrobacter sp. and members of the genera Halomonas, Pseudomonas, Hyphomonas, and Sphingomonas. Species of Acinetobacter, Aerococcus, Flavobacterium, Listeria, Pseudomonas, Serratia, and Yersinia are commonly present in animal-derived foods. Another example is Chryseobacterium greenlandensis, a psychrophile that was found in 120,000-year-old ice.

Umbilicaria antarctica and Xanthoria elegans are lichens that have been recorded photosynthesizing at temperatures ranging down to −24 °C (−11 °F), and they can grow down to around −10 °C (14 °F). Some multicellular eukaryotes can also be metabolically active at sub-zero temperatures, such as some conifers; those in the Chironomidae family are still active at −16 °C (3 °F).

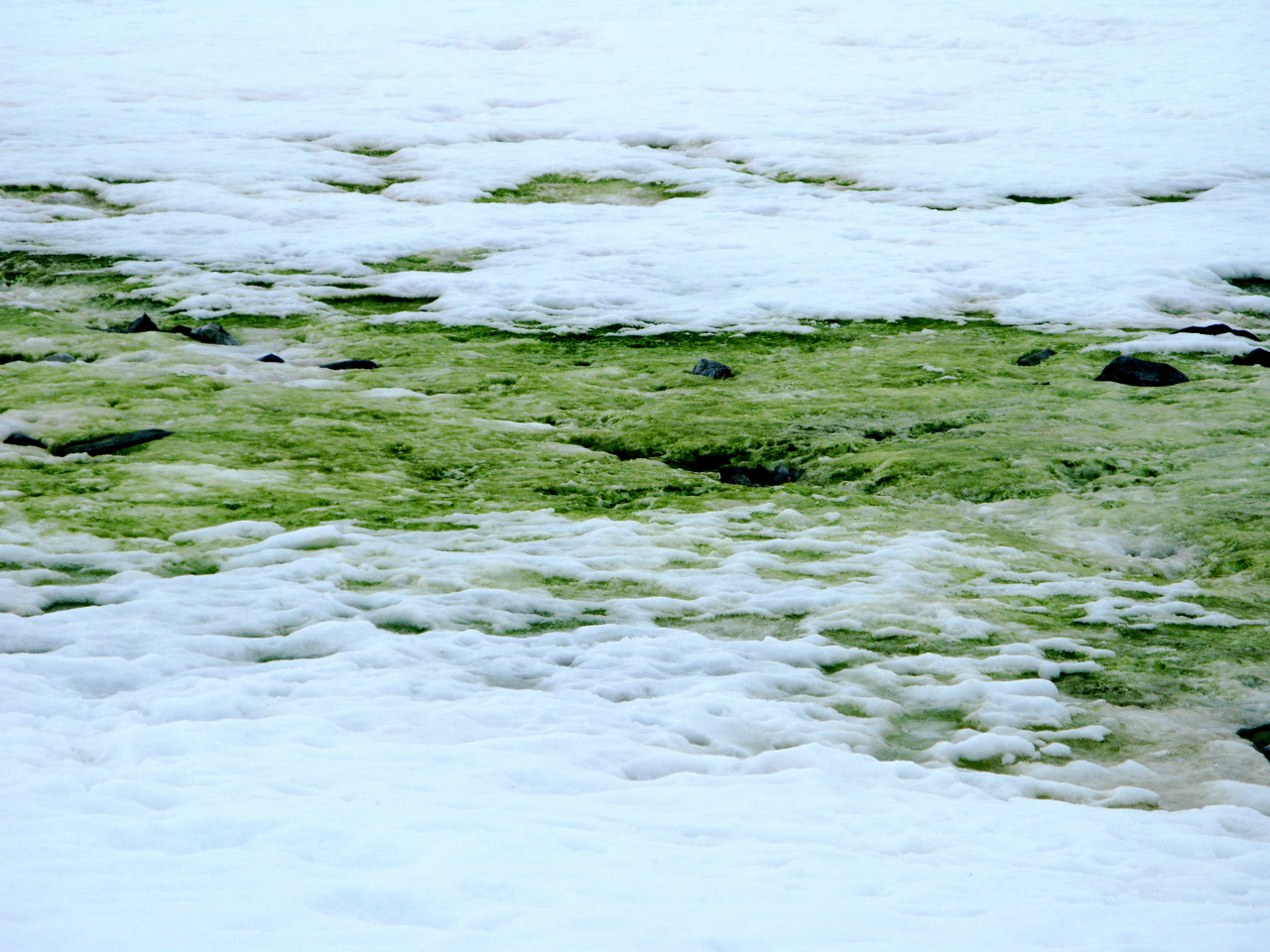
Psychrophilic algae can tolerate cold temperatures, like this Chlamydomonas green algae growing on snow in Antarctica.

Microalgae that live in snow and ice include green, brown, and red algae. Snow algae species such as Chloromonas sp., Chlamydomonas sp., and Chlorella sp. are found in polar environments.

Some phytoplankton can tolerate extremely cold temperatures and high salinities that occur in brine channels when sea ice forms in polar oceans. Some examples are diatoms like Fragilariopsis cylindrus, Nitzchia lecointeii, Entomoneis kjellmanii, Nitzchia stellata, Thalassiosira australis, Berkelaya adeliense, and Navicula glaciei.

Penicillium is a genus of fungi found in a wide range of environments including extreme cold.

Among the psychrophile insects, the Grylloblattidae or ice crawlers, found on mountaintops, have optimal temperatures between 1 and 4 °C (34 and 39 °F). The wingless midge (Chironomidae) Belgica antarctica can tolerate salt, being frozen and strong ultraviolet, and has the smallest known genome of any insect. The small genome, of 99 million base pairs, is thought to be adaptive to extreme environments.

== Psychrotrophic bacteria ==
Psychrotrophic microbes are able to grow at temperatures below 7 °C (44.6 °F), but have better growth rates at higher temperatures. Psychrotrophic bacteria and fungi are able to grow at refrigeration temperatures, and can be responsible for food spoilage and as foodborne pathogens such as Yersinia. They provide an estimation of the product's shelf life, but also they can be found in soils, in surface and deep sea waters, in Antarctic ecosystems, and in foods.

Psychrotrophic bacteria are of particular concern to the dairy industry and the use of dairy products. They not only spoil milk products but also are capable of producing heat-resistant enzymes and toxins that can be dangerous to humans. Most psychrotrophic bacteria are killed by pasteurization; however, they can be present in milk as post-pasteurization contaminants due to less than adequate sanitation practices. According to the Food Science Department at Cornell University, psychrotrophs are bacteria capable of growth at temperatures at or less than 7 °C. At freezing temperatures, growth of psychrotrophic bacteria becomes negligible or virtually stops.

All three subunits of the RecBCD enzyme are essential for physiological activities of the enzyme in the Antarctic Pseudomonas syringae, namely, repairing of DNA damage and supporting the growth at low temperature. The RecBCD enzymes are exchangeable between the psychrophilic P. syringae and the mesophilic E. coli when provided with the entire protein complex from same species. However, the RecBC proteins (RecBCPs and RecBCEc) of the two bacteria are not equivalent; the RecBCEc is proficient in DNA recombination and repair, and supports the growth of P. syringae at low temperature, while RecBCPs is insufficient for these functions. Finally, both helicase and nuclease activity of the RecBCDPs are although important for DNA repair and growth of P. syringae at low temperature, the RecB-nuclease activity is not essential in vivo.

== Psychrophilic microalgae ==
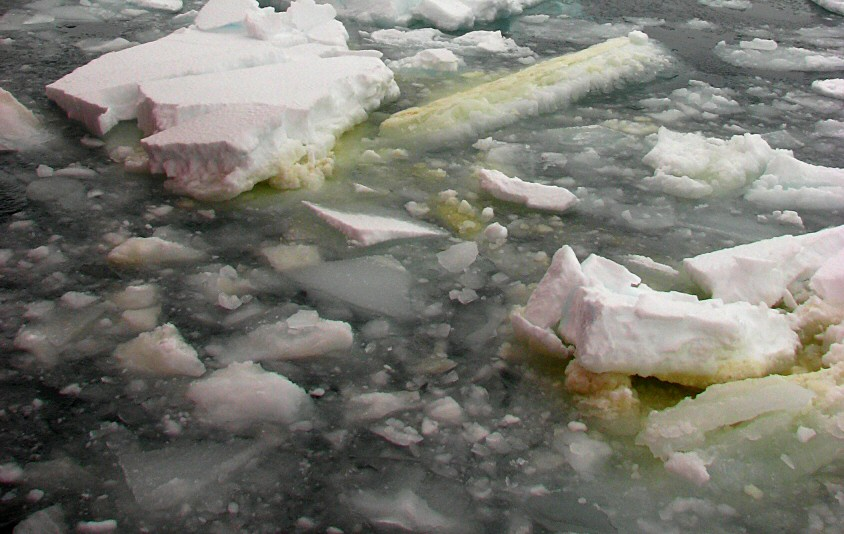
Antarctic diatom algae covering the underwater surface of broken sea ice in the Ross Sea.

Microscopic algae that can tolerate extremely cold temperatures can survive in snow, ice, and very cold seawater. On snow, cold-tolerant algae can bloom on the snow surface covering land, glaciers, or sea ice when there is sufficient light. These snow algae darken the surface of the snow and can contribute to snow melt. In seawater, phytoplankton that can tolerate both very high salinities and very cold temperatures are able to live in sea ice. One example of a psychrophilic phytoplankton species is the ice-associated diatom Fragilariopsis cylindrus. Phytoplankton living in the cold ocean waters near Antarctica often have very high protein content, containing some of the highest concentrations ever measured of enzymes like Rubisco.

== Psychrotrophic insects ==
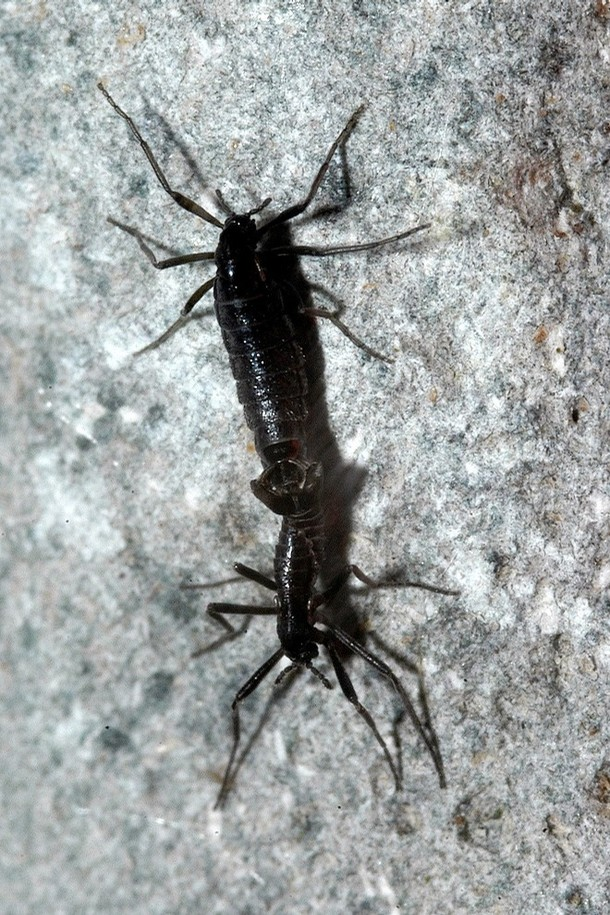
The wingless midge (Chironomidae) Belgica antarctica.

Insects that are psychrotrophic can survive cold temperatures through several general mechanisms (unlike opportunistic and chill susceptible insects): (1) chill tolerance, (2) freeze avoidance, and (3) freeze tolerance. Chill tolerant insects succumb to freezing temperatures after prolonged exposure to mild or moderate freezing temperatures. Freeze avoiding insects can survive extended periods of time at sub-freezing temperatures in a supercooled state, but die at their supercooling point. Freeze tolerant insects can survive ice crystal formation within their body at sub-freezing temperatures. Freeze tolerance within insects is argued to be on a continuum, with some insect species exhibiting partial (e.g., Tipula paludosa, Hemideina thoracica ), moderate (e.g., Cryptocercus punctulatus), and strong freezing tolerance (e.g., Eurosta solidaginis and Syrphus ribesii), and other insect species exhibiting freezing tolerance with low supercooling point (e.g., Pytho deplanatus).

== Ecological Roles ==
Psychrophilic microbes are able to contribute to biochemical reactions within cold environments by functioning during periods where most other living organisms cannot. At lower temperatures than normal, Psychrophile's enzymatic processes continue to occur, although they may do so with slower reaction rates, resulting in the decomposition of organic matter.

Psychrophile's can also play an important role in cold ecosystems such as those found on sea ice, snow or permafrost by supporting the nutrient cycling of organic matter through the degradation of this material. The subsequent release of Carbon and Nitrogen is then allowed to recycle back into the environment as a result of the breakdown of this organic material, thereby allowing the recycling to occur over extended periods.

== Psychrophile versus psychrotroph ==
In 1940, ZoBell and Conn stated that they had never encountered "true psychrophiles" or organisms that grow best at relatively low temperatures. In 1958, J. L. Ingraham supported this by concluding that there are very few or possibly no bacteria that fit the textbook definitions of psychrophiles. Richard Y. Morita emphasizes this by using the term psychrotroph to describe organisms that do not meet the definition of psychrophiles. The confusion between the terms psychrotrophs and psychrophiles was started because investigators were unaware of the thermolability of psychrophilic organisms at the laboratory temperatures. Due to this, early investigators did not determine the cardinal temperatures for their isolates.

The similarity between these two is that they are both capable of growing at zero, but optimum and upper temperature limits for the growth are lower for psychrophiles compared to psychrotrophs. Psychrophiles are also more often isolated from permanently cold habitats compared to psychrotrophs. Although psychrophilic enzymes remain under-used because the cost of production and processing at low temperatures is higher than for the commercial enzymes that are presently in use, the attention and resurgence of research interest in psychrophiles and psychrotrophs will be a contributor to the betterment of the environment and the desire to conserve energy.

== See also ==
- Chionophile
- Extremophile
- Halophile
- Ice algae
- Mesophile
- Osmophile
- Pathogenic microorganisms in frozen environments
- Thermophile
- Xerophile
