= List of Monsters Inside Me episodes =

This is a list of episodes of Monsters Inside Me is an American television documentary series about people who have survived infectious diseases. It ran for eight seasons from 2009 to 2017 on Animal Planet in the United States, and Discovery Science in Canada. Several years later, the show would be renewed for a ninth season that premiered in November 2026 on Discovery Channel in the United States.

It includes first-person interviews with people and medical professionals telling their personal stories about contracting various parasitic, viral, bacterial, and fungal diseases. Interviews with contributors are shot on location across North America. Recreations are mostly filmed in hospitals and homes in New York City.

== Series overview ==
Season	Episodes	Originally released		
Season	Episodes	First released	Last released	Network
1	6	July 1, 2009	August 5, 2009	Animal Planet
2	10	June 9, 2010	August 25, 2010	Animal Planet
3	10	October 5, 2012	December 7, 2012	Animal Planet
4	10	September 30, 2013	December 18, 2013	Animal Planet
5	10	October 9, 2014	December 18, 2014	Animal Planet
6	10	October 29, 2015	December 22, 2015	Animal Planet
7	7	October 6, 2016	December 15, 2016	Animal Planet
8	12	October 15, 2017	December 17, 2017	Animal Planet
9	12	November 11, 2026	TBA	Discovery Channel

== Season 1 (2009) ==
No. overall	No. in season	Title	Original release date	Prod. code
1	1	"Sleeper Cells"	July 1, 2009	101
In 2002, an 11-month-old baby boy is infected with Baylisascaris procyonis worms that cause him to sleep excessively, lose his balance and almost go blind. In 1967, an elderly Vietnam War veteran was diagnosed with malaria and successfully treated, but later in 2003, he has his legs and testicles destroyed by Lymphatic filariasis caused by Wuchereria bancrofti worms. A young man gets Schistosoma mansoni flukes in his brain, which cause dizziness and nausea and which he picked up from Africa in 1998.
2	2	"Outbreak!"	July 8, 2009	102
A closer look at parasitic outbreaks from across the U.S. In 2000, a group of teenage students are affected by Angiostrongylus cantonensis worms after they ate a contaminated salad in Jamaica. An outbreak of Cryptosporidium hominis occurs in the southern part of Milwaukee, Wisconsin, and kills 101 people, caused by human feces contaminating the city's water system and evaded the water treatment as the cysts survive chlorine. An elderly delivery man in Dallas, Texas comes down with leishmaniasis.
3	3	"Sex Maniacs"	July 15, 2009	103
A young man gets botfly maggots in his head after he went on a trip to Belize. An employee at a chemical factory who used to smoke contracts the Paragonimus kellicotti fluke from eating raw crayfish, causing him to cough up blood. A teenage waitress deals with bed bugs who have hitched a ride in her suitcase after staying in a hotel on vacation.
4	4	"Masters of Disguise"	July 22, 2009	104
A 16-year-old girl contracts Acanthamoeba keratitis from expired contact lenses and almost loses her sight. An elderly Bangladeshi doctor is infected with Strongyloides stercoralis worms that lay dormant inside his body for 60 years. A 56-year-old runner contracts babesiosis without even noticing it.
5	5	"Hijackers"	July 29, 2009	106
In 1998, a four-year-old boy almost goes blind in his left eye due to Toxocara canis. An 11-year-old boy dies from the rare naegleriasis caused by Naegleria fowleri after wakeboarding in a Florida lake. A man comes down with human African trypanosomiasis.
6	6	"Living with the Enemy"	August 5, 2009	105
A Bolivian woman is infected with 10 to 15 Taenia solium cysts that reduce her flow of spinal fluid she got when she grew up in Bolivia. A farmer comes down with toxoplasmosis and almost goes blind in his left eye. A New York banker contracts malaria.

== Season 2 (2010) ==
No. overall	No. in season	Title	Original release date	Prod. code
7	1	"Suicide Attackers"	June 9, 2010	202
A teenage dance instructor is suddenly stopped in her tracks by unbearable abdominal pain and vomiting. Tests find a mysterious mass in her colon that turns out to be made of decaying Anisakis simplex worms that she became infected with by eating raw salmon in sushi. A middle-aged banker gets headaches and seizures from Taenia solium that he acquired while traveling to his home country of Haiti. In 1981, a scientist is infected with onchocerciasis and self-administers ivermectin to treat his symptoms, marking the first use of the medicine on humans.
8	2	"Feeding Frenzy"	June 16, 2010	203
Entamoeba histolytica eats 60% of a schoolteacher's liver; to save his life, doctors remove most of his liver, so that the surviving portion can recover. A teenage dancer becomes concerned when her skin is covered with a red and lumpy rash which is discovered to be the result of a parasitic worm called Trichinella spiralis that she contracted from eating an undercooked pork sandwich. A retiree gets scabies from staying in a dusty hospital after his knee surgery.
9	3	"Cold-Blooded Killers"	June 23, 2010	201
A 9-year-old hockey player gets struck with an Acanthamoeba brain infection which causes him to fall comatose that he contracted when he scooped a hockey puck from the pond at a party. A computer programmer gets extreme Plasmodium falciparum malaria and sufferers from strange post-malarial neurological symptoms two weeks after an apparent recovery. A Chinese marathon runner contracts visceral leishmaniasis, which destroys his spleen.
10	4	"Lurkers"	July 7, 2010	204
Cryptosporidium contaminated water causes a toddler to suffer from severe vomiting and diarrhea. A rare and deadly amoeba known as Balamuthia mandrillaris kills an immunocompromised firefighter through granulomatous amoebic encephalitis. A rare, vicious tapeworm almost detaches the retina in a teenage girl, partially destroying vision in her left eye. Tests reveal the tapeworm was Taenia crassiceps, which she picked up when she failed to wash her hands after gardening during lunch.
11	5	"Flesh Eaters"	July 14, 2010	205
A teenage college student from Austin, Texas gets a strange wound on his arm that slowly grows and oozes after a trip to South America that turns out to be leishmaniasis. In 1994, a young animal volunteer suffers the pain of a hookworm in her chest after a sickly cat scratches her. In 1991, an elderly couple deal with a strange rash that randomly appears and vanishes that turns out to be caused by the Gnathostoma roundworm they picked up from raw catfish during a trip to Africa.
12	6	"Stowaways"	July 28, 2010	207
A 53-year-old carpenter gets infected with the Japanese lung fluke, which causes him to have trouble breathing, from eating live crabs in a Chinese restaurant. In 1996, an Irish bike rider develops a rash on her groin and upper thighs caused by Schistosoma haematobium, which almost gave her bladder cancer. An African-American guidance counselor, who was an army veteran, develops an insatiable appetite, unusual weight loss, and abdominal pain that turns out to be Ascaris lumbricoides, which he picked up from eating contaminated food while serving in the army.
13	7	"Breeders"	August 4, 2010	206
In 2005, a 16-year-old boy gets a maggot in his eye, making it impossible for him to see clearly. A Portuguese construction worker deals with a grapefruit-sized hydatid cyst caused by Echinococcus granulosus in his pelvis that causes him severe pain that he contracted when he was young. In 1995, a nine-year-old girl becomes infected with Giardia lamblia, which gives her severe stomach cramps and diarrhea.
14	8	"Double Agents"	August 11, 2010	208
In 1973, a teenage Peace Corps volunteer in the Himalayas discovers that he has a young leech living in his nose after drinking fresh water from a pond in Nepal, inadvertently drawing the leech into his nostril in the process. In 1994, a British nature-loving landscaper who suffers from debilitating allergies deliberately infects himself with hookworms during a vacation to Africa to help relieve his symptoms. A 6-year-old girl on vacation in South Africa gets a maggot in her foot.
15	9	"Homegrown Enemies"	August 18, 2010	209
A middle-aged man who has been caring for his ailing elderly mother gets babesiosis from walking barefoot to the mailbox. Since he lost his spleen from cancer, he gets severe diarrhea, in addition to fever, fatigue, and night sweats. An active, busy middle-aged woman experiences stomach cramps, explosive diarrhea, lightheadedness, and blurred vision from the worm Toxocara canis, which she probably got from contaminated food. A 57-year-old mother of five children suffers nausea, loss of appetite, muscle spasms, and vomiting caused by Strongyloides worms damaging her intestines, which she might have picked up from being in contact with infected soil. Because of the steroids she took for her asthma problems, her body became more vulnerable to the parasitic worms.
16	10	"Shape Shifters"	August 25, 2010	210
In 1997, a seven-year-old girl suffers headaches and seizures from a pork tapeworm (Taenia solium) after being adopted at the age of three from Nepal. A 45-year-old machinist and welder suffers blurry and double vision, leaving him partially blind in his left eye, caused by a raccoon roundworm (Baylisascaris procyonis) that he picked up while turkey hunting. Also in 1997, a 45-year-old anesthesiologist, along with 28 other anesthesiologists from three different counties, suffer severe stomach cramps and crippling diarrhea from Cyclospora cyclosporiasis that was contracted after eating unwashed raspberries in a luxury restaurant. (Note: at the time when this episode was shot, people and restaurants were not washing raspberries because water pressure causes the berries to break apart).

== Season 3 (2012) ==
No. overall	No. in season	Title	Original release date	Prod. code
17	1	"My Child Will Only Eat Cat Food"	April 8, 2012 (UK); October 5, 2012 (US)	306
A toddler suddenly starts worrying her parents when she loses her appetite for the foods she normally eats. Then, she starts craving salt and starts to eat cat food, but becomes stunted in her growth. After the little girl develops a strange rash, her parents learn that she has been infected by the Toxocara canis parasite. A middle-aged executive of a company had been living a healthy life, until he suddenly starts feeling pain in his abdomen. Initially, it seems he simply has a colon condition called diverticulitis. However, the abdominal cramps return and become so intense that they force him to go to the hospital and get surgery. There, the man discovers that his colon has been invaded by a pathogenic form of Escherichia coli. An older married couple is celebrating their planned future, when suddenly, they both have flu-like symptoms. When the doctor discovers swollen lymph nodes on the woman's groin area, the couple learns that they have been infected by the bubonic plague. The wife recovers faster than the husband, who has both of his legs amputated due to developing gangrene. The fleas and prairie dogs on their property were also infected by the plague.
18	2	"Something's Eating My Son Inside Out"	April 1, 2012 (UK); October 12, 2012 (US)	305
A teenage boy has been enjoying his summer vacation, but after a swim in a lake, he starts complaining of nasal pain, and fever. At first, he appears to have sinusitis. The boy soon develops a swollen eye, loose teeth and pieces of rotten flesh start to drop off of his nose. It turns out that he has a weakened immune system, and that he was infected with a rare, flesh-eating bacterium known as Chromobacterium violaceum. A young model and actress has been living happily with her husband. When she breastfeeds her baby daughter, though, the young mother feels pain and even notices blood on herself. These symptoms are apparently due to a breast condition called mastitis. Although this clears up, she develops pain and numbness in her limbs, itchiness on her chest, headaches, and fatigue. Her doctors and husband doubt the young model/actress' condition, but a dream and surgery confirm that her illness has been caused by the black mold Aspergillus niger, which was introduced to her body through contaminated breast implants. A teenage college student has been enjoying college life until she suddenly feels chest pain. Her breathing becomes more difficult and painful. Initially, she appears to have walking pneumonia, but antibiotics fail to treat her. Her doctor soon learns that the girl's lungs have been infected by a deadly yeast known as Blastomyces dermatitidis.
19	3	"My Face Eating Parasite"	March 25, 2012 (UK); October 19, 2012 (US)	304
A young man and his girlfriend have been enjoying life together, traveling in South America. During their trip, the man suddenly discovers what appears to be a pimple on his face. It seems minor at first, but his face becomes swollen, and the pimple becomes an oozing wound. Soon, the man also starts having bumps in his throat, and thus soreness in that area and lesions on his back. It turns out that he has been suffering from mucocutaneous leishmaniasis. A young man working at a homeless shelter suddenly feels sharp pain in his back. It appears to be a simple back injury, but the pain is extremely sharp and spreads to his hands and arms. He also starts to develop a generalized vasculitis. After many tests, it becomes clear that he has rat-bite fever, caused by Streptobacillus moniliformis which was contracted from rats while cleaning out storage containers at the homeless shelter. A school-aged boy suddenly develops a headache after spending time at a friend's house. At first, it does not appear to be an issue, but the pain spreads to his back and one morning he has a seizure. It turns out to be valley fever and after being on life support, he dies due to the incompetence of the medical staff.
20	4	"My Daughter Is Losing Her Mind"	March 4, 2012 (UK); October 26, 2012 (US)	301
A young part-time student has been living happily with her new husband when suddenly, she feels a throbbing headache. Initially, she appears to have the flu, then meningitis. Soon, though, she starts experiencing hallucinations. Doctors start to believe that she is schizophrenic, but it turns out she has anti-NMDA receptor encephalitis, caused by a teratoma. An eight-year-old boy suddenly starts worrying his parents when he comes down with a stomach ache and vomits. It appears to be simple food poisoning, but soon, the boy begins experiencing intense pain and swelling in his legs. It soon becomes clear that he has been suffering from viral rhabdomyolysis, a disease in which the influenza A virus destroys muscle cells. Because of this, the boy had the highest CPK levels ever recorded but manages to survive despite this frightening condition. A self-employed plumber was taking night shifts when he starts vomiting. He attempts to hide his condition and just deal with it, but the next thing he does is start misspelling common words. It is suspected that he has stomach cancer. However, further examinations indicate that the man has actually been infected by the Blastocystis hominis parasite.
21	5	"Something's Eating My Dreams"	April 22, 2012 (UK); November 2, 2012 (US)	308
A teenage girl has been enjoying her life of gymnastics and nature when she suddenly receives a scratch on her hand. The problem seems minor, but the scratch fails to heal and becomes several lesions, which also spread to her eyeballs. The infection appears to be caused by methicillin-resistant Staphylococcus aureus, but it turns out that she has been infected by Mycobacterium marinum, that she contracted from her aquarium. A middle-aged man suddenly feels as if he is choking and coughs hard. Initially, it appears to be a case of pneumonia, but after surgery to fix his spine, he develops stabbing pain in his throat. The coughing returns, and it turns out that he did, indeed, swallow a can tab, which he manages to successfully expel after nearly choking to death. It snapped and flew into his mouth after opening a soda can. A young man suddenly starts complaining of itchiness in his body. He develops a headache, nausea, body aches, and an inability to urinate. Tests show that the man has developed meningitis from Angiostrongylus cantonensis.
22	6	"A Monster's Taking My Baby"	March 11, 2012 (UK); November 9, 2012 (US)	302
A middle school teacher has been having a healthy pregnancy until suddenly, she starts experiencing abdominal cramps and diarrhea. It initially appears to be a case of the flu, but she soon starts bleeding during episodes. At this point, the young woman appears to have hemorrhoids, which progressively worsen. Tests show that she has been infected by Cryptosporidium hominis. A retired schoolteacher enjoys his retirement with his wife when suddenly, he feels a lack of appetite for his favorite food. It does not appear to be an issue at first, but his appetite continues to decline, and he starts coughing frequently. His coughing fits worsen to the point where breathing becomes incredibly difficult. It appears to be pneumonia, but it turns out that a pea has been lodged in his lung and began to grow. A young truck driver has been fairly healthy when suddenly, discovers a strange speck in his vision. Later, he develops pain, irritation, and blurry vision in his right eye. It turns out that he has had a pork tapeworm in his right eye during a horse show.
23	7	"I Coughed Up Worms!"	March 18, 2012 (UK); November 16, 2012 (US)	303
A young mother expecting her second child suddenly comes down with a stuffy nose and itchy throat. They appear to be typical flu symptoms, but she still feels feverish and soon starts coughing. Her breathing deteriorates to the point where she cannot breathe on her own anymore. It turns out that the young woman has developed an Acinetobacter baumannii infection she caught in a previous hospital through a ventilator. An energetic college student has been healthy until she suddenly feels like she cannot get enough oxygen and starts wheezing. She develops bouts of coughing so bad that she even coughs up worms. The student learns that she has been infected by the worm Ascaris lumbricoides the whole time. A teenage girl living in the countryside suddenly gets headaches. At first, it appears to be from stress, but she soon becomes irritable, has seizures, and mood swings, and develops triple vision. Only when it is too late does it become clear that the teenager has died from rabies.
24	8	"My Brain Has Been Hijacked"	April 29, 2012 (UK); November 23, 2012 (US)	309
A baby boy born prematurely alarms his parents when he suddenly comes down with a fever. Soon, he also starts resisting food and coughs severely to the point of coughing up blood. It is revealed that the baby has swallowed a button battery, which has burned a hole in his esophagus. A young, newly independent university student suddenly gets a headache, which persists longer than she is used to. Next, she experiences auditory hallucinations, twitching of her head, confusion over her age, and even grand mal seizures. As she rests in preparation for brain surgery, the young woman suddenly yells and then passes out. It turns out that she has an abscess in her brain caused by a Streptococcus milleri infection from her tongue piercing. A mother and wife has been enjoying a vacation with her family until she suddenly gets a headache. As her condition progresses, she also experiences a fever; cloudy, foul-smelling urine; dizziness and disorientation, body aches, and even petechiae on her legs. Her doctor discovers that the woman has been suffering from dengue fever the whole time when a mosquito bit her ankle.
25	9	"You Left What Inside Me?"	May 6, 2012 (UK); November 30, 2012 (US)	310
A little girl's health begins to deteriorate when she suddenly comes down with a fever. She then develops reddish spots on her body, stops breathing on her own, and even suffers kidney and liver failure. A spinal tap reveals that the little girl has meningococcal disease, which causes her to have her limbs amputated. A home contractor has been relatively healthy until he suddenly begins to gain weight in his abdominal area, which turns out to be caused by a large tumor. After the removal of the tumor, the man feels excruciating pain that spreads from his abdomen to his lower back and chest. Initially, it appears to be part of his recovery process, but an x-ray shows that a retractor has been left in his body after the surgery. In 2010, in Arlington, Texas, a 7-year-old baseball star's life is cut short by excessive sweating, headaches, fevers, vomiting, anxiety, violent and uncontrollable seizures, and death from the rare naegleriasis after swimming in a lake where Naegleria fowleri was living.
26	10	"Killer in My Neck"	April 15, 2012 (UK); December 7, 2012 (US)	307
A young aspiring artist suddenly comes down with flu-like symptoms and a swollen face. To make matters worse, his eyes are yellow, he has trouble breathing, and one of his eyes protrudes strangely. It turns out that he has Lemierre's syndrome. An active girl's life is put on hold when she starts feeling fatigued and out of breath. Later, she also starts experiencing extreme joint pain, and she gets diagnosed with Lyme disease. However, further testing shows that the girl has babesiosis, in addition to chronic Lyme disease. An active middle-aged woman becomes concerned when she suddenly feels lumps in her chest. After getting them removed, she then starts experiencing bleeding from her right breast as a result of two surgical sponges.

== Season 4 (2013) ==
No. overall	No. in season	Title	Original release date	Prod. code	US viewers (millions)
27	1	"The Flesh-eating Monster"	September 30, 2013	401	N/A
A seven-year-old girl contracts the bubonic plague and suffers a 107-degree fever, vomiting, painful buboes, and seizures after laying her jacket down next to a dead squirrel. A yoga instructor finds out that what she thought was influenza is actually necrotizing fasciitis caused by Streptococcus intermedius and Peptostreptococcus. A state wrestling champion contracts angiostrongyliasis.
28	2	"There's a Worm in My Eye"	October 7, 2013	404	N/A
A two-year-old boy suffers vomiting, loss of appetite and major intestinal damage after swallowing eight magnetic beads. A teenage ballerina suffers painful migraines, ear pain, headaches, and muscle cramps for nearly five years due to the West Nile virus when she got bitten by a mosquito while at camp. A preacher gets infected with Loa loa worms in his eye, torso and legs, which he contracted two years prior while on a missionary trip in Equatorial Guinea.
29	3	"Choosing Between Life and Limb"	October 11, 2013	405	N/A
A newly engaged Illinois man mysteriously collapses and suffers organ failure and gangrene from Legionnaires' disease, which requires doctors to amputate his limbs. A perky animal-loving eight-year-old girl survives rabies which she got from getting scratched on the arm by a cat at school, becoming the third documented unvaccinated survivor of the disease. A college freshman almost goes blind from a bout of Acanthamoeba keratitis because of contaminated contact lenses.
30	4	"It Came From a Tick..."	October 18, 2013	402	N/A
A mother-of-four struggles with a mysterious lump that emerges on the neck of her two-year-old daughter, which doctors discover is caused by tularemia, a deadly bacterial infection caused by Francisella tularensis transmitted by the American dog tick. A mother of two who suffers from debilitation, nausea, abdominal pain, and jaundice for four years finally finds out her symptoms have been caused by Fasciola hepatica. A five-year-old boy develops intense body pains and almost stops breathing due to Guillain–Barré syndrome which was triggered by the flu virus.
31	5	"My Husband is Hallucinating"	October 25, 2013	403	N/A
A small-town boy's summer fun is cut short by a life-threatening Neisseria meningitidis infection. An oil rig worker and daredevil experiences sensitivity to light, muscle pain and horrifying hallucinations from Trichinella spiralis after eating bear meat. A former beauty queen suffers an extreme case of asthma for one year from a nasal packing contaminated with Aspergillus niger fungi.
32	6	"Dying Abroad"	November 17, 2013 (UK); December 11, 2013 (US)	407	N/A
A Peace Corps volunteer working in Burkina Faso suddenly suffers from excruciating bouts of nausea and diarrhea from Entamoeba histolytica, which she believes she got from eating contaminated food from a communal bowl. A young woman almost suffocates due to hantavirus pulmonary syndrome caused by the Sin Nombre virus which she picked up from breathing in dust contaminated with mouse feces while cleaning up. An 18-month-old boy gets infected with Baylisascaris procyonis worms which cause his brain to swell.
33	7	"Maggots Are Eating Me"	November 24, 2013 (UK); December 11, 2013 (US)	408	N/A
A teenager caught in the 2011 Joplin tornado in Missouri is recovering in the hospital when he suddenly suffers from a life-threatening case of mucormycosis. A couple on a safari adventure in Africa get maggots from a tumbu fly under their skin. A man suffers coughing fits, severe headaches, vertigo, and violent episodes (including chasing one of his sons with a wrench and punching another in the face) before doctors discover the fungus Cryptococcus neoformans has infected his brain.
34	8	"A Deadly Swim"	December 1, 2013 (UK); December 18, 2013 (US)	409	N/A
A teenage boy develops stomach pains, starts vomiting blood and fecal matter, and has nausea from accidentally swallowing a bristle from a grill brush, which got lodged in his intestines. In 2011, a 16-year-old girl who swam in a Florida river experiences a headache, fever, vomiting, mental confusion, unusual behavior and dies from the rare Naegleria fowleri. An industrial painter has difficulties breathing and walking from Blastomyces dermatitidis. His partner believed that the ongoing constructions could've caused the spores to infect him.
35	9	"My Christmas From Hell"	December 15, 2013 (UK); December 18, 2013 (US)	406	0.71
A special episode with three cases that happened during the holidays: A newlywed woman gets constant pain in her scalp from botfly larvae. A Virginia man gets sharp back pains and develops a hole in his heart from Streptococcus viridans during a dental exam. A female business consultant and part-time photographer gets valley fever after a photo shoot in a windstorm.
36	10	"I Almost Killed My Baby"	December 8, 2013 (UK); December 18, 2013 (US)	410	N/A
A newborn baby develops hydrocephalus and blindness from a parasitic disease called toxoplasmosis, which he contracted from his mother, who ate undercooked lamb at a restaurant while she was pregnant with him. An 11-year-old boy suffers headaches, vomiting, uncontrollably speaking gibberish, and seizures from being infected with eastern equine encephalitis, which his mother believes he got from being bitten by a mosquito on a school field trip. A teenager living on a farm suffers a severe cough and fever from Paragonimus kellicotti after eating some uncooked crawfish.

== Season 5 (2014) ==
No. overall	No. in season	Title	Original release date	Prod. code	US viewers (millions)
37	1	"My Daughter's Going Crazy"	October 9, 2014	501	N/A
A teenage girl begins having strange mood swings from anti-NMDA receptor encephalitis caused by a teratoma growing on her ovary. An elderly mother gets chills, hand numbness, wrist pain, and oozing blisters from Vibrio vulnificus she got from being pricked by a crab while making a stew. An athletic military veteran from the Afghan war competing, in reality, shows returns home from Fiji feeling hotness, a pinching sensation in her arms and toes, and hallucinations from rat lungworm she got from eating a slug in a reality show in the jungle.
38	2	"West Nile Attack!"	October 16, 2014	502	N/A
A six-year-old boy suffers a nasty cough, fever, and vomiting from valley fever which he contracted from his family's backyard. A newlywed husband becomes paralyzed from the waist down due to the West Nile virus when mosquitoes bit one of his feet. An international journalist suffers extreme stomach cramps, night sweats, chills, nausea, and fever from Entamoeba histolytica after eating a contaminated salad while working abroad in Guinea-Bissau.
39	3	"A Menace in My Own Backyard"	October 23, 2014	503	0.51
A 23-year-old athlete & construction worker suffers multiple grand mal seizures and high fevers from eastern equine encephalitis when a mosquito bit his right arm. A hard-edged tough guy suffers severe stomach pains and loss of appetite from accidentally swallowing a grill bristle. A 17-year-old cheerleader who recently got her driver's license suffers a swollen, itchy eye and excruciating eye pains from Acanthamoeba keratitis she got from contact lenses which were contaminated.
40	4	"The Killer in the Lake"	November 6, 2014	505	N/A
A contractor gets hit in the head with a tool, and later starts getting a pounding headache, dizziness, spotty vision, and nausea from having a nail punctured into his brain at work. A football player in college gets extreme headaches, a stuffy nose, and blurred vision from Aspergillus fungi entering his brain. In 2012, an eight-year-old boy who swam in a South Carolina lake suffers constant vomiting, fatigue, seizures, and eventually dies from the rare naegleriasis during a summer vacation when he swam at a beach that had Naegleria fowleri-contaminated water.
41	5	"There's a Worm Crawling in My What?"	November 13, 2014	506	N/A
A Canadian science-lover and traveler suffers a painful lesion caused by botfly larvae. A video game programmer suffers from constant vomiting and coughing. When doctors find a large mass in his chest, it is discovered that he has histoplasmosis, which was contracted from inhaling bat droppings in a cave (Tragically, nearly a year after the episode's airing, he would die from complications). A 15-year-old girl gets an extremely sore throat, a headache, nausea, and body pains from Lemierre's syndrome.
42	6	"Vampire Parasites Attack"	November 20, 2014	507	N/A
A war veteran suffers fatigue, high fevers, night sweats, strange rashes, bloody urine, and jaundice from babesiosis during a training lesson in the woods. A 15-month-old baby girl suffers fever, dry mouth, vomiting, and bloody diarrhea from E. coli O157:H7. The dangerous strain almost kills her before it is discovered she was infected after drinking raw milk. A biologist suffers extreme fatigue, back pains, anxiety, and vertigo from Aspergillus-contaminated breast implants.
43	7	"A Holiday in the Hospital"	December 4, 2014	504	0.31
The second episode of the series to be Christmas-themed: A saleswoman gets a stabbing headache and a constant burning sensation in her right eye from a Dirofilaria immitis worm that is in her eye that she contracted from getting bit by mosquitoes. A store manager gets stomach pains, fatigue, nausea, vomiting, and even a constantly moving stomach from a surgical sponge being left and forming a hole in his colon during his previous surgery. A grandmother working in the forest service gets abdominal pains, fatigue, and pneumonia from Strongyloides worms invading her intestines, possibly from cleaning toilets at work or walking barefoot.
44	8	"My Body Is Rotting"	December 11, 2014	508	0.94
A teenager gets coughing, shoulder pains, dizziness, and nausea from Cryptococcus gattii fungi invading her lungs when she was at a friend's house. A saleswoman gets extreme pain in her breast from a brown recluse spider (Loxosceles reclusa) bite. A religious youth organizer gets swelling of multiple parts of her body over three years from the Loa loa worm, which she had while on a training mission in Cameroon.
45	9	"The Brain Colonizer"	December 11, 2014	510	0.86
A Canadian 13-month-old toddler gets breathing difficulties and suffers painful burns to his esophagus from a button battery that he swallowed, which the doctors originally thought was a coin. A college freshwoman gets migraines, nausea, on-and-off blindness, hallucination-like partial seizures, repulsive taste and two lesions in her brain from an infection with Taenia solium when she ate some produce off a street vendor in Dominica. In 2008, a six-year-old girl gets a headache, a rash, high fevers, internal bleeding, low blood pressure, a seizure and dies from Rocky Mountain spotted fever after a tick bit her on the leg.
46	10	"I Smell Like Death"	December 18, 2014	509	0.69
A 29-year-old man gets tooth pain and almost dies of necrotizing fasciitis caused by the bacteria Streptococcus intermedius and Peptostreptococcus. A female financial adviser gets fatigue, joint pain, mental confusion, hair loss, and muscle weakness for over three years from Lyme disease after spending time in the woodlands. A seven-year-old boy gets a loss of appetite, abdominal pains, a fever, diarrhea, constant vomiting, and weight loss from Cryptosporidium after swimming in a contaminated pool with his cousins.

== Season 6 (2015) ==
No. overall	No. in season	Title	Original release date	Prod. code	US viewers (millions)
47	1	"There's Something Living In My Knee!?"	October 29, 2015	603	0.64
A four-year-old boy comes down with respiratory illness symptoms and almost drowns in his own mucus, being a victim of an outbreak of the Enterovirus D68 virus. A seven-year-old boy scrapes his knee on a rock at the beach. His father uses a liquid bandage solution to seal the cut shut, but then the boy's knee begins to swell. The culprit is later discovered to be a species of sea snail (Littorina scutulata) which managed to survive inside the joint after being forced inside during the accident. A college student experiences loss of appetite, fatigue, fever, jaundice, and repetitive nightmares that turn into a reality from getting infected with Plasmodium falciparum malaria after returning from a trip to Ghana.
48	2	"Help! My Son is a Leper"	October 29, 2015	604	0.51
An athlete gets headaches, stomach pains, breathing difficulties, and a liver mass from Entamoeba histolytica from a trip to Nicaragua. A teenager develops a leg welt and then gets fatigue and red spots on his body over several years and when the spots open, the doctors discover he has leprosy from coming into contact with an infected nine-banded armadillo (Dasypus novemcinctus). A woman suffers severe headaches, nausea, vomiting, and seizures from Exserohilum rostratum fungi invading her brain and spinal column due to contaminated steroids (her case is one of many from the 2012 New England Compounding Center meningitis outbreak).
49	3	"My Vacation From Hell"	November 5, 2015	602	0.51
During a fishing vacation, a soccer coach goes into septic shock from Vibrio vulnificus necrotizing fasciitis after banging his ankle on a barnacle. A seven-year-old girl gets facial tics, bouts of anxiety, and turns suicidal after a streptococcal brain infection took place when she was at the dentist. A makeup artist gets severe stomach cramps and watery diarrhea from Giardia lamblia after cleaning up her foster dog's fecal matter in the bathroom.
50	4	"There's a Fungus in My What!?!"	November 5, 2015	601	0.47
A newlywed woman gets extreme headaches, memory problems, sinus pressure, and painful rashes, while her husband gets endless nosebleeds, breathing problems, and brain fog, both from Aspergillus when the mold invaded their new home. A councilman loses his spleen to visceral leishmaniasis after traveling to southern Spain. A six-year-old boy gets a fever, red spots, a swollen mouth, loss of appetite, leg weakness, and breathing difficulties from rat bite fever caused by Streptobacillus moniliformis after a rat scratched one of his wrists.
51	5	"Worms Are Eating My Lungs"	November 12, 2015	606	0.44
An 11-month-old boy experiences wheezing and vomiting after swallowing a button battery. A landscaper becomes infected with Paragonimus kellicotti whilst eating an undercooked crawfish at the Missouri river. A female boxer gets a severe headache, a 105 fever, and impaired vision from cat scratch fever caused by Bartonella henselae when she was scratched by her pet kitten.
52	6	"An Amoeba is Eating My Brain"	November 19, 2015	610	0.51
A two-year-old girl experiences severe pain, trouble breathing, and vomiting from a bark scorpion sting while she was playing in the playroom. A neuroscientist experiences multi-organ failure and nearly dies from a leptospirosis infection that he caught while swimming in a lake in Hawaii. A 20-year-old woman suffers from severe vomiting, extreme headaches, twitching and a strange crawling sensation in her head that turns out to be a brain infection caused by Balamuthia mandrillaris and dies from it. Her mother believes that she contracted the amoeba during a swim in a nearby lake in the desert.
53	7	"The Eyeball Eater"	December 3, 2015	607	0.43
A young college student contracts Acanthamoeba keratitis from sleeping in her contact lenses. An infant becomes temporarily paralyzed and almost dies from accidental ingestion of soil that contained the most deadly toxin known to science, botulinum toxin. A new mother has extreme pain from a piece of gauze that was left inside her abdomen during a C-section.
54	8	"The Backyard Killer"	December 10, 2015	608	0.42
A California teenager nearly suffocates from hantavirus pulmonary syndrome which he contracted from his family's backyard. A Hawaiian personal trainer suffers years of excruciating neuropathic pain from ciguatera poisoning caused by Gambierdiscus toxicus toxins. A Michigan health worker nearly dies from babesiosis when a tick lands on her.
55	9	"All I Got For Christmas Is Brain Surgery"	December 17, 2015	605	0.53
The third episode of the series to be Christmas-themed: A baby girl is having problems controlling the left side of her body, along with multiple miniature seizures before doctors discover the right side of her brain is malformed due to a Cytomegalovirus infection during one of her mother's trimesters. A PR executive suffers a year-long ailment that turns out to be a cyst caused by Echinococcus granulosus tapeworms infecting her spleen during a trip to Israel. Seizures ruin a schoolteacher's Thanksgiving, and when they worsen around Christmas, doctors discover that she has neurocysticercosis caused by a Taenia solium cyst. It is most likely that she contracted the tapeworm from eating uncooked tacos in Mexico.
56	10	"They Hijacked My Eyeball"	December 22, 2015	609	0.50
A 13-year-old boy gets a cut on his leg that nearly leads to amputation when it becomes infected with Staphylococcus aureus, causing necrotizing fasciitis. A couple move into their new home, but over three years, the man suffers a spreading/oozing rash, poor coordination, body aches, breathing difficulties, and weight loss, while his girlfriend suffers memory loss, fatigue, and suicidal depression, both from chronic low grade carbon monoxide poisoning in the house. An 8-year-old girl from Hawaii gets a growing mass in her eyeball from Toxocara canis while playing in a garden.

== Season 7 (2016) ==
No. overall	No. in season	Title	Original release date	Prod. code	US viewers (millions)
57	1	"Backyard Killers"	October 6, 2016	706	N/A
This episode looks back at three cases from past episodes: A teenage boy with a grill bristle in his intestines ("A Deadly Swim"). Another teenage boy with leprosy ("Help! My Son is a Leper"). A teenage girl whose lungs are afflicted with Cryptococcus gattii fungi ("My Body Is Rotting").
58	2	"I Have a WHAT in My WHAT?"	October 13, 2016	701	N/A
An infant becomes totally paralyzed after accidental exposure to botulinum toxin during a walk in a park. A Texas man develops severe pain in his scrotum which doctors think is an ingrown hair, but it actually turns out to be botfly larvae which infected him while he urinated outdoors in Costa Rica. A Florida model/dentist is confounded by her mysterious weight gain, and over a year, she suffers continuing weight gain, blurry vision, crippling hand pain, and muscle weakness before it is discovered her breast implants are contaminated with Aspergillus fungi.
59	3	"There's Something Living in My Hand!"	October 20, 2016	702	N/A
An Idaho 17-year-old football player is struck with a sore throat, breathing difficulties with lung pain, confusion, kidney failure and even tackles his own mother from Group A streptococcus bacteria infecting his blood. An Illinois mother of three kids develops an itchy eye which leads to face numbness, loss of depth perception and blindness as the result of an Acanthamoeba keratitis infection. A dockmaster develops crippling pain in his hand from a Mycobacterium marinum infection along with pimples on his palm from barnacles growing in his hand.
60	4	"My Wife is Rotting"	October 27, 2016	703	N/A
In 2016, during a family vacation cruise, a Louisiana two-year-old girl is restless and drools, which leads to vomiting, fever, seizures, kidney and liver failure due to abrin poisoning after accidentally eating a bead from a necklace made of the rosary pea plant on a trip to Jamaica. A California mother-of-two develops a bloated and descended stomach and colon, a body-wide rash, fluid in her abdomen and meningitis from valley fever caused by Coccidioides immitis in Central California. A six-year-old boy suffers a headache, vomiting, blindness and bizarre neurological symptoms which include crossed eyes and increased intracranial pressure that ultimately costs him his life. Only when it is too late is it discovered that he was infected with the Balamuthia mandrillaris amoeba.
61	5	"My Hands Are Falling Off"	November 3, 2016	704	N/A
A Canadian woman suffers a piercing pain in her throat and vomiting from accidentally swallowing a grill bristle (which she thought was a sprig of rosemary) which got caught in her throat during a barbecue. An Arizona retired firefighter vacationing in Belize develops growing and eventually opening purple bumps on his limbs, lethargy, and hand pain from cutaneous leishmaniasis. A Nebraska 14-year-old girl is struck with swollen lymph nodes in her neck, dizziness, fatigue, blackouts, and body pain from Tularemia which she contracted from a tick bite on her neck.
62	6	"My Evil Twin is Driving Me Crazy"	November 10, 2016	705	N/A
A 4-year-old Pennsylvania boy gets a runny nose with red discharge, stomach pains, pale skin, and extreme pain from accidentally putting a button battery up his nose. An Idaho college student gets a cut on her knee, but then develops agonizing leg pain followed by septic shock from an Aeromonas hydrophila infection. A Pennsylvania woman suffers powerful delusions and outbursts of extremely violent behaviour, the result of a teratoma growing on her ovary giving her anti-NMDA receptor encephalitis.
63	7	"Holiday from Hell"	December 15, 2016	707	N/A
The show's fourth Christmas-themed episode, and the second episode of the series that looks back at three past cases, including: A baby girl whose brain was infected with Cytomegalovirus in utero ("All I Got For Christmas Is Brain Surgery"). A woman whose eye is infected with the worm Dirofilaria immitis ("A Holiday in the Hospital"). A man who has a surgical sponge left in his colon (also "A Holiday in the Hospital").

== Season 8 (2017) ==
No. overall	No. in season	Title	Original release date	Prod. code	US viewers (millions)
64	1	"Help! I'm Being Eaten Alive"	October 15, 2017	802	0.52
A young girl traveling abroad to Colombia with her family is brought to the hospital with stabbing pains in her scalp due to worms from the New World screwworm fly. A mother of two falls ill with excruciating period cramps, foul smelling urine, green discharge, vaginitis, and a burning sensation due to a surgical probe left behind during a previous surgery. A man develops dizziness, chills and fever, arm pain, and rashes from Vibrio vulnificus.
65	2	"My Brain Is Under Attack"	October 15, 2017	805	0.47
A young man develops severe headaches, loss of concentration, vomiting, hydrocephalus and falls into a coma from a brain infection caused by Taenia solium. A university student gets a sore throat, fevers, loss of balance, and organ failure from Lemierre's syndrome, caused by Fusobacterium necrophorum. A young woman suffers from emotional distress, foggy memory, chest pains, bloody vomit and extreme pain from babesiosis. Her mother believes that she contracted the infection when she was a child.
66	3	"My Second Brain Is Killing Me"	October 22, 2017	801	0.49
A man experiences a strange swelling in his eye along with extreme pain from a warble fly larva growing in his eyelid. A young girl comes down with cold symptoms/lethargy, vomiting, paralysis, shortness of breath and acute flaccid myelitis caused by Enterovirus D68. A woman develops a strange sense of taste and restlessness which is originally diagnosed as a urinary tract infection, but later develops hallucinations, paranoia and seizures from anti-NMDA receptor encephalitis caused by a football-sized teratoma growing in her ovary. Her teratoma contained hair, bone, esophageal tissue, nervous tissue, and brain cells.
67	4	"The Monster in My Mouth"	October 29, 2017	806	0.37
An infant suffers from cold-like symptoms, vomiting, seizures and encephalitis from a brain infection caused by the Powassan virus which he got from a tick bite. A biology professor investigates rough patches in his mouth, determining a parasite to be at fault, which he finds to be Gongylonema pulchrum, one of the rarest human parasites on the planet. A Canadian family man suffers acute bloody diarrhea from a damaged colon which he cures with steroids, but soon suffers from delirium, meningitis, and thousands of holes throughout his stomach and small intestine from a body-wide infection caused by Strongyloides larvae, which leads to his death. Afterward, his daughter is discovered to harbor the worms as well but recovers after she is treated with ivermectin for a few days.
68	5	"There's a Maggot in My Head"	November 5, 2017	803	N/A
A new mother gets extreme abdominal pains, low blood pressure, and septic shock from a group A streptococcus infection that leads to the removal of her colon, uterus, and ovaries, and she develops Purpura fulminans, which requires amputation of all her limbs. An eight-year-old boy gets a small, raised, oozing scratch on his head, swollen lymph nodes on both sides of his head, pain and a crawling sensation in his head from a botfly larva that burrowed into his scalp from a trip to Costa Rica. A 25-year-old man suffers from fatigue, body pain, muscle paralysis, and meningitis from rat lungworm disease after he tried to clean a hose.
69	6	"Something Is Eating My Baby"	November 12, 2017	804	N/A
A young Hawaiian boy suffers a high fever, eye discharge, blisters in his mouth, body-wide rashes, peeling skin, labored breathing, pneumonia and shock from Stevens–Johnson syndrome/toxic epidermal necrolysis from having a reaction to ibuprofen or an earlier infection, resulting in him developing photophobia and losing 60% of his skin. A woman develops bouts of back/joint pain, spreading rashes and skin lesions over six years from filariasis after she bought her pet dog from Argentina. A Canadian 14-month-old toddler develops teething, a 101-degree fever, loss of motor control, encephalitis, and blindness caused by Baylisascaris procyonis.
70	7	"Braced for Death"	November 19, 2017	807	N/A
A teenager develops a headache, fevers, swollen lips, a burning sensation in her throat, vomiting, blotchy, pus-filled sores in and on her mouth, weakness, loss of appetite, an enlarged spleen and weight loss from a nickel allergy from her braces. An athlete suffers chills, high fevers, excruciating headaches, hallucinations, liver/kidney failure and pneumonia from leptospirosis, which he got from swimming in a lake in Costa Rica. A young woman vomits blood and loses a concerning amount of weight from Entamoeba histolytica.
71	8	"I Can't Stop Coughing Up Blood"	November 26, 2017	808	N/A
An adventurous family man suffers from chest tightness, shortness of breath, bloody sputum, labored breathing and a growing mass in his lung from Paragonimus kellicotti. A young newlywed man develops fevers, headaches, spreading rashes, ocular hypertension, fatigue and loss of concentration from the Zika virus, which he contracted from his honeymoon to Jamaica. A young man begins having stabbing abdominal pains from accidentally swallowing a toothpick from a club sandwich he ate, which got lodged in his intestine.
72	9	"The Organ Shredder"	December 3, 2017	809	N/A
A Virginia infant develops a loss of appetite, loss of motor control, and weakness from ingestion of the botulinum toxin, causing infant botulism. A New York man gets blurry vision, eye pain and sensitivity to light due to Acanthamoeba keratitis which he contracted from a vacation to the Cayman Islands. A nursing assistant begins coughing, has excruciating abdominal pains, brown urine and an inflamed gallbladder from infection by Cystoisospora belli, which she got from treating a victim of the 2010 Haiti earthquake.
73	10	"My Lungs Are Rotting"	December 10, 2017	811	N/A
A Florida woman gets painful, oozing blisters on her face, chest, arms, and legs and rashes from Toxocara worms after eating contaminated pizza. A California baby develops high fevers, an inability to swallow, wheezing/coughing and difficulty breathing from swallowing a penny which got embedded in his esophagus for at least two weeks. A Wisconsin man begins having chest pain, extreme coughing, an inflamed lung, pale skin and shortness of breath from Blastomyces dermatitidis, as part of the blastomycosis outbreak of the Wolf River.
74	11	"All I Got For Christmas"	December 17, 2017	810	N/A
This episode is the series' fifth Christmas-themed episode, and is also the third episode to look back at cases from previous episodes, including: A man with a nail in his head ("The Killer in the Lake"). A boy with a snail shell in his knee ("There's Something Living in My Knee!?"). An elderly man with a pea in his lung ("A Monster's Taking My Baby").
75	12	"There Are Twigs In My Urine"	December 17, 2017	812	N/A
A California traveler develops itchy bumps on his legs and a growth on his wrist from cutaneous leishmaniasis from a group of mosquitos. A nurse begins to have abdominal pains, dizziness, and bloody twig-like pieces in her urine over several years from schistosomiasis, which she contracted while cave diving in Belize. A pregnant store manager suffers chills, severe headaches, night sweats, and abdominal pains from infection with listeria, which forces doctors to deliver her baby six months premature. It turns out that she might have contracted the infection by eating a contaminated vegetable.

== Season 9 (2026-) ==
No. overall	No. in season	Title	Original release date	Prod. code	US viewers (millions)
76	1	"What's Feeding on You?"	November 11, 2026	902	N/A
A woman salmon seining in Alaska develops an irritation in her eye and migraines from the Thelazia gulosa parasite infecting her eye, becoming the first known human case. A turkey hunter and home health physical therapist develops chronic flu-like symptoms and diarrhea, and later on, anaphylaxis brought on after eating a burger, and is eventually diagnosed with Alpha-gal syndrome contracted from a lone star tick bite. A mother returning home from a family vacation in Hawaii develops a rash, nerve pain, intense headaches and vomiting, an inability to speak properly, and double vision from a brain infection with the Angiostrongylus cantonensis parasite.
77	2	"The Beach, the Bug and the Bite"	November 18, 2026	901	N/A
A teenage boy who went on a mission trip to Florida experiences intense itching sensations and red, growing bumps on his feet as the result of cutaneous larva migrans caused by hookworms, which he likely got from walking barefoot on the beach. A young girl returning home from a trip to Mexico, in 1966, develops a high fever, eye infection, and comes to close to death, but manages to recover. Five decades later, in her adulthood, she develops a relentless cough, trouble swallowing, and retinal detachment in her left eye caused by the cough, which after a few more years is discovered to be the result of Chagas disease, which she contracted as a young child during their 1966 trip to Mexico after being bitten by a kissing bug. A man working in oil fields in northern Alaska and working as a fishing guide develops a sharp pain in his side and persistent cough from an Anisakis simplex worm migrating from his stomach to his liver, as the result of eating infected salmon.
78	3	"Bears, Brains and an Eye Invader"	November 25, 2026	903	N/A
79	4	"The Lies Our Bodies Tell"	December 2, 2026	904	N/A
