= Shapeshifter (disambiguation) =

A shapeshifter is a mythic being that can change its physical shape.

Shapeshifter or shapeshifters may also refer to:

== Arts and entertainment ==
=== Film and television ===
==== Films ====
- Shapeshifter (film), a 2005 horror film
- Shapeshifter (1999 film), a 1999 family film starring Emmanuelle Vaugier

==== Television episodes ====
- "Shape Shifter", a 2003 episode of Astro Boy (2003)
- "Shapeshifter", a 2005 season 1 episode of American Dragon: Jake Long
- "Shape Shifter", a 2005 season 2 episode of New Captain Scarlet
- "Shape Shifter", a 2008 season 1 episode of Paranormal State
- "Shape Shifters", a 2010 season 2 episode of Monsters Inside Me
- "Shape-Shifters", a 2011 season 1 episode of Monster Bug Wars
- "Shapeshifter", a 2016 episode of Sindbad & the 7 Galaxies
- "Shapeshifter", a 2016 season 2 episode of The 7D
- "Shape-Shifters", a 2019 season 1 episode of Love, Death & Robots
- "The Shapeshifters", a 2020 season 15 episode of Ancient Aliens
- "The Shapeshifter", a 2022 season 1 episode of Mars Ravelo's Darna
- "Shape Shifter", a 2023 episode of Psi Cops

==== Characters and elements ====
- Founders (Star Trek), or "Shapeshifters", a fictional race of so-called "changelings"
- Experiment #210/The Shape Shifter, a fictional alien creature in Gravity Falls

=== Literature ===
- The Shapeshifter, a 2006 book by Ali Sparkes
- The Shape Shifter, a 2006 novel by Tony Hillerman
- Shape-Shifter (book), a 1990 a collection of short stories by Pauline Melville

== Music ==
=== Groups ===
- Shapeshifter (band), a New Zealand drum and bass group
- The Shapeshifters, a British electronic music group
- The Shape Shifters, a hip hop group from Los Angeles

=== Albums ===
- Shapeshifter (The Dead Rabbitts album), 2014
- Shapeshifter (Gong album), 1992
- Shapeshifter (Knuckle Puck album), 2017
- Shapeshifter (Marcy Playground album), 1999
- Shapeshifter (Memphis May Fire album), 2025
- Shapeshifter (Smile Empty Soul EP), 2016
- Shapeshifter (Space Tribe album), 2001
- Shapeshifter, by The Contortionist, 2008, or its title track
- Shapeshifter, by Tempest, 2003
- Shape Shifter (album), by Santana, 2012
- Shapeshifting (Joe Satriani album), 2020, or its title track
- Shapeshifting (Young Galaxy album), 2011

=== Songs ===
- "Shapeshifter", by Alessia Cara from In the Meantime, 2021
- "Shapeshifter", by Bleed from Within from Shrine, 2022
- "Shapeshifter", by Cave In, 2005
- "Shapeshifter", by Celldweller, 2005
- "Shapeshifter", by Haken from Visions, 2011
- "Shapeshifter", by Level 42 from The Pursuit of Accidents, 1982
- "Shapeshifter", by Lorde from Virgin, 2025
- "Shapeshifter", by Septicflesh from Sumerian Daemons, 2003
- "Shapeshifter", by Upon a Burning Body from Fury, 2022
- "Shape Shifter", by Amon Amarth from Deceiver of the Gods, 2013
- "Shape Shifter", by They Might Be Giants from Phone Power, 2016
- "Shape-Shifter", by Invent Animate from Greyview, 2020
- "Shape-Shifter", by Within the Ruins from Halfway Human, 2017
- "Shape Shifters", by The Faceless from Planetary Duality, 2008

== Computing ==
- ShapeShifter, defunct software developed by Unsanity
- ShapeShifter (animation), a web based animation service
- Shapeshifter (software), a clipboard manager by Flamefusion

== Other ==
- Shapeshifters (board game) published in 1991
- Shapeshifter, a role in the 2018 video game Among Us

== See also ==
- Shapeshifting (Young Galaxy album), a 2011 album by Young Galaxy
- Metamorph (disambiguation)
- Therianthropy (disambiguation)
