= Therian =

Therian may refer to:

- A member of the mammalian subclass Theria, consisting of marsupial and placental mammals
- Therianthropy (mythology), the mythological ability or affliction of individuals to metamorphose into animals or hybrids by means of shapeshifting
- Therian subculture, a subculture whose members identify as non-human animals

== See also ==
- Therien (disambiguation)
- Therin
- Therion (disambiguation)
- Therium
- Therianthropy (disambiguation)
- Metamorph (disambiguation)
- Shapeshifter (disambiguation)
