= C11ORF97 =

Human gene and protein

C11orf97

Identifiers
- Aliases: C11orf97, LINC01171, chromosome 11 open reading frame 97
- External IDs: MGI: 1916575; HomoloGene: 75283; GeneCards: C11orf97; OMA:C11orf97 - orthologs

Gene location (Human)
Chr.	Chromosome 11 (human)
Band	11q21	Start	94,512,461 bp
Band	11q21	End	94,532,123 bp

Gene location (Mouse)
Chr.	Chromosome 9 (mouse)
Band	9|9 A2	Start	14,667,883 bp
Band	9|9 A2	End	14,682,326 bp
RNA expression pattern
Bgee	Human / Mouse (ortholog); Top expressed in: bronchial epithelial cell; right uterine tube; olfactory zone of nasal mucosa; testicle; mucosa of paranasal sinus; left testis; right testis; buccal mucosa cell; nucleus accumbens; anterior cingulate cortex / Top expressed in: olfactory epithelium; seminiferous tubule; spermatid; spermatocyte; endothelial cell of lymphatic vessel; Ependyma of ventricular system of brain; left lung lobe; embryo; embryonic organizer; paraventricular nucleus of hypothalamus; More reference expression data
BioGPS	n/a
Orthologs
Species	Human	Mouse
Entrez	643037	69325
Ensembl	ENSG00000257057	ENSMUSG00000031927
UniProt	A0A1B0GVM6	Q9DAE7
RefSeq (mRNA)	NM_001190462	NM_029306
RefSeq (protein)	NP_001177391	NP_083582
Location (UCSC)	Chr 11: 94.51 – 94.53 Mb	Chr 9: 14.67 – 14.68 Mb
PubMed search
- Wikidata
View/Edit Human	View/Edit Mouse

C11ORF97, or Chromosome 11 Open Reading Frame 97, is a protein which in humans is encoded by the C11ORF97 gene. It is hypothesized to localize to the cytoplasm, and plays a role in the ciliary basal body. Based on its protein interactions, it is thought to have a role in Lemierre's Syndrome and Hepatic Coma.

== Gene ==
Human C11ORF97 gene is 19,663 basepairs long including all introns, spanning from position 94,512,461 to 94,532,123. It is found on the long arm of chromosome 11 at 11q21, with a plus strand orientation. Human C11ORF97 has only one known variant.

== mRNA transcript ==
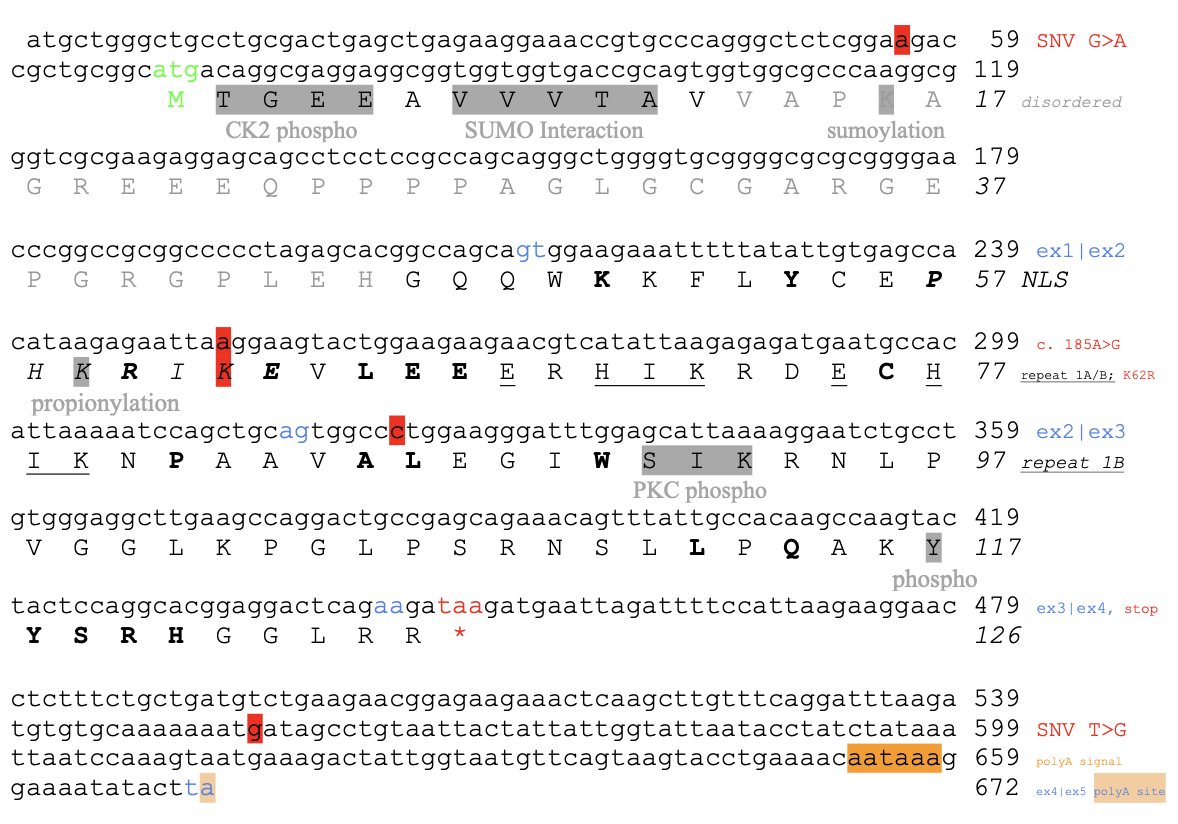
Annotated conceptual translation of human C11ORF97 mRNA with aligned peptide sequence, showing important conserved, repeated, and modified regions.

=== Expression ===
Human C11ORF97 expression is seen in many tissues, however, it is mainly seen in the lungs and the brain. According to Human Protein Atlas, the consensus dataset for RNA tissue specificity on C11ORF97 shows six different parts of the brain having some of the highest expression, stating that the enriched groups are brain, choroid plexus, fallopian tube, and lung. According to The Human Protein Atlas, human C11ORF97 RNA tissue specificity was highest in different parts of the brain, as well as the lungs. Although it was high in testes, this is most likely not significant to this gene.

== Protein ==
=== Features ===
The one variant of C11ORF97 produced in humans is 126 amino acids in length, and a predicted weight of 13.9 kDa. It has an isoelectric point of pH 9.87. It has no transmembrane regions, and no domains of unknown functions. The amino acid composition from SAPS tool shows that there is enriched G and R, and highly lessened S, T, D, and F amino acids.

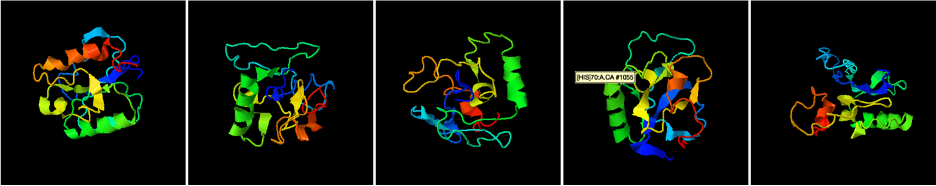
i-TASSER Tertiary Structure Results for Human C11ORF97.

=== Subcellular localization ===
Human C11ORF97 expected localization is in the cytoplasm, with a score of 0.5188, according to DeepLoc. The following tools produced no results when searching for C11ORF97 localization: NetNES, SignalP, TatP, or Human Protein Atlas. A nuclear localization signal, as well as a nuclear export signal was found, suggesting that C11ORF97 most likely has a role in the nucleus, and is then exported to the cytoplasm.

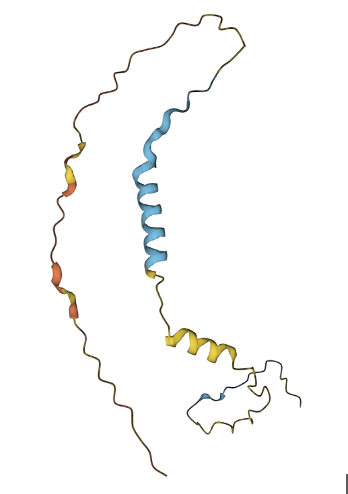
Tertiary Structure for Human C11ORF97 from AlphaFold.

=== Structure ===
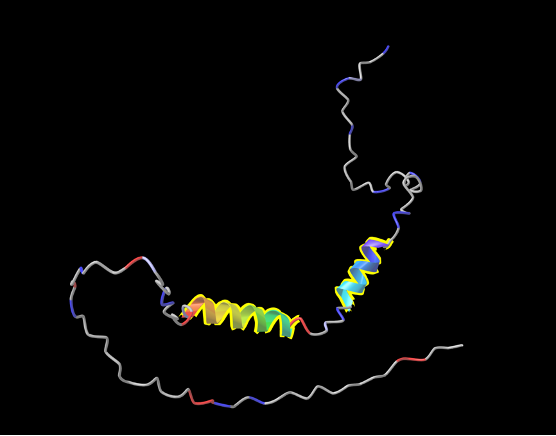
Annotated Tertiary Structure of Human C11ORF97 from AlphaFold, annotated with NCBI Integrated Sequence Viewer (iCN3D).

The tertiary structure was viewed through AlphaFold, i-TASSER and annotated with NCBI's iCN3D tool. These results are shown in the figures to the right, all of them include similar, or near identical features—two alpha helices and no beta sheets.

The C-scores for the 5 i-TASSER models, in order, are -3.59, -4.88, -5.00, -4.47, and -5.00. Thus, the first structure in this figure has the most confidence compared to the other four predicted structures.

== Function ==
=== Protein-protein interactions ===
There were only a couple protein-protein interactions found for human C11ORF97, with a medium or higher confidence threshold.

Name	Full Name	Score	Identification	Description
MORN2	MORN repeat-containing protein 2	0.693	Textmining	Predicted to be involved in cell differentiation and spermatogenesis. Associated with Lemierre's Syndrome and Hepatic Coma.
CRACR2A	Calcium release activated channel regulator 2A	0.583	Textmining	Enables GTPase activity and calcium ion binding. Involved in activation of store-operated calcium channel activity and store-operated calcium entry.

== Post-translational modifications ==
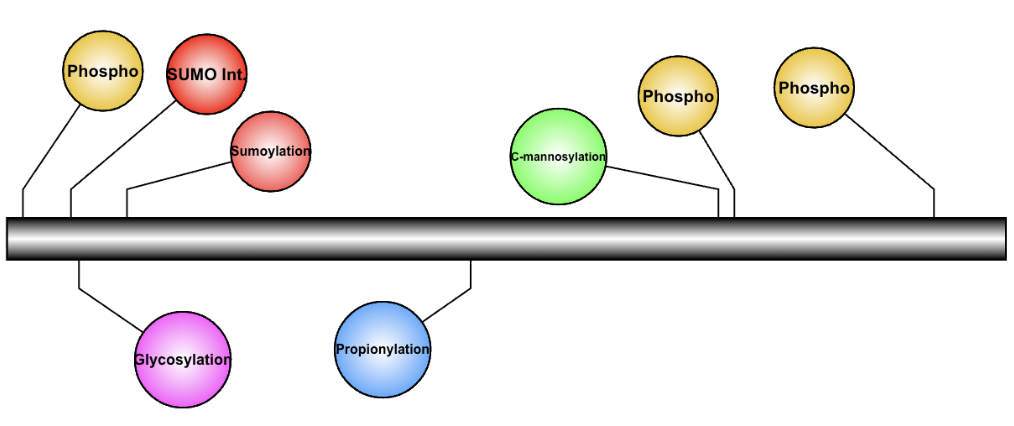
Illustration of C11ORF97 protein post translational modifications, including phosphorylation, glycosylation, c-mannosylation, propionylation, sumoylation, and a SUMOinteraction.

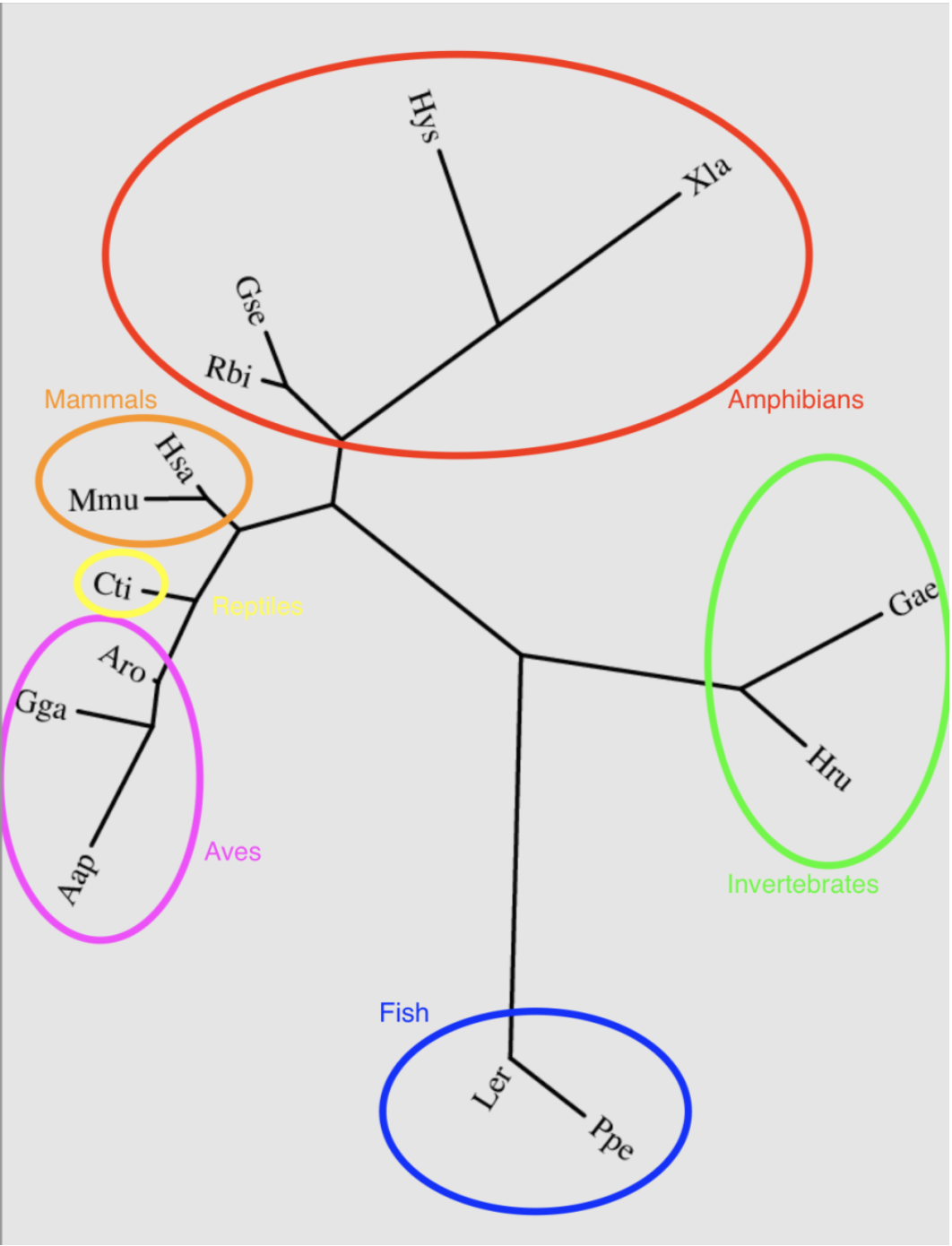
Unrooted Phylogenetic tree for C11ORF97 orthologs. Three letter codes can be found in the figures of multiple sequence alignments.

There are many post-translational modifications found in Human C11ORF97, many of which are conserved in orthologs. There are many phosphorylation sites, as well as a SUMOinteraction and sumoylation site, and others. These types post-translational modifications have various functions, and can play a role in cell growth and proliferation. A more detailed description is seen in the illustration to the right.

== Homology and evolution ==
Human C11ORF97 protein is found in vertebrates and invertebrates. It is found in the following vertebrates: mammals, birds, reptiles, amphibians, and fish. Human C11ORF97 seems to have first appeared in invertebrates 686 million years ago. All of the comparisons are seen in Table 2 below. An unrooted phylogenetic tree is also provided, showing the predicted likelihood of how the orthologs for this gene are related. Multiple sequence alignments for strict and distant orthologs are also provided as figures. The codes for the 3 letter abbreviations are the same between figures.

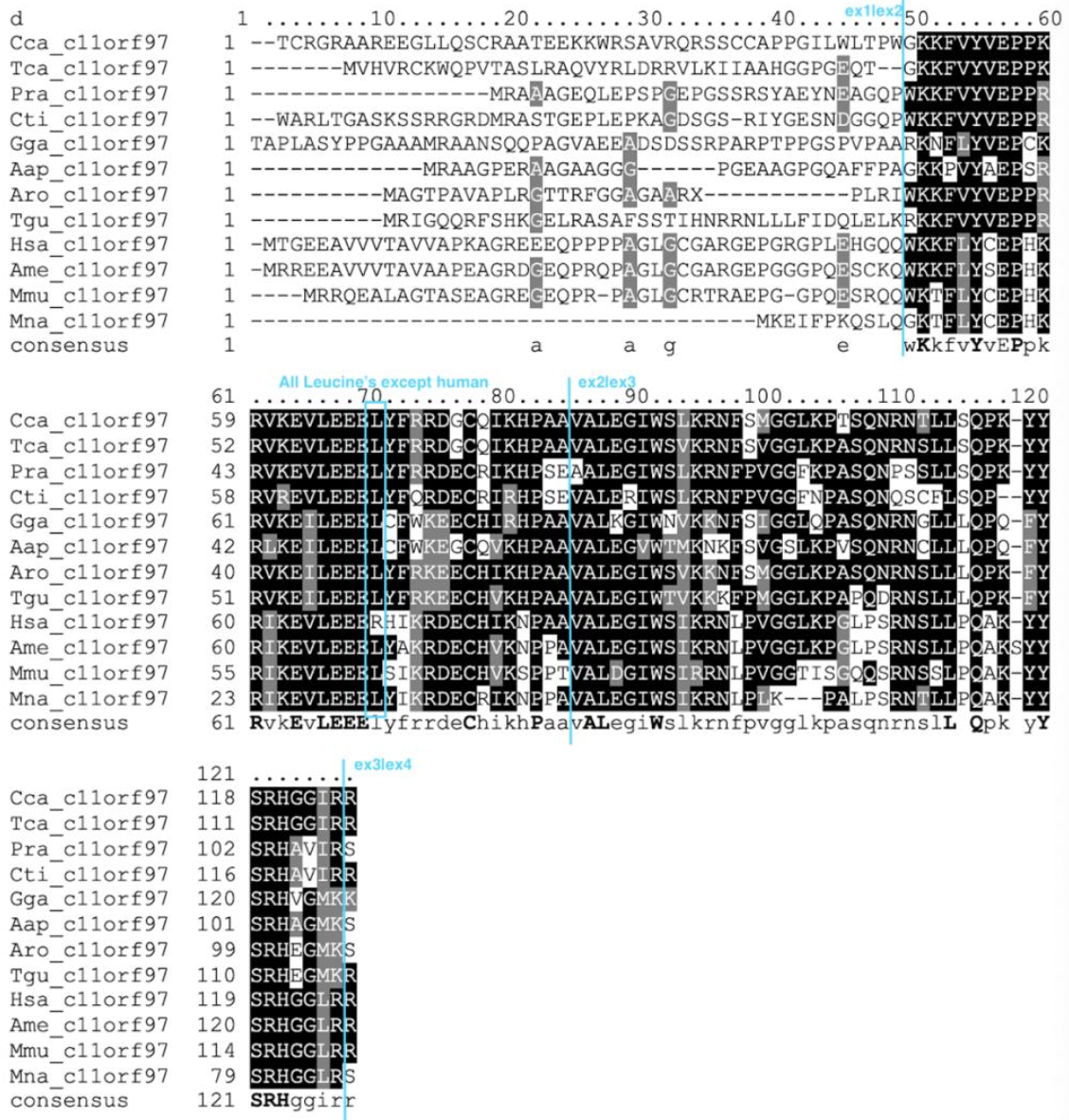
Annotated Multiple Sequence Alignments of Human C11ORF97 Protein and StrictOrthologs. The orthologs in this alignment are from mammals, birds, and reptiles. This alignment was made using ClustalW, and shading was done using BoxShade. The 3 letter codes are as follows: Cca, Caretta caretta; Tca, Terrapene Carolina triunguis; Pra, Podarcis raffonei; Cti, Crotalus tigris; Gga, Gallus gallus; Aap, Apus apus; Aro, Apteryx rowi; Tgu, Tinamus guttatus; Has, Homo sapiens; Ame, Ailuropoda melanoleuca; Mmu, Mus musculus; Mna, Miniopterus natalensis.

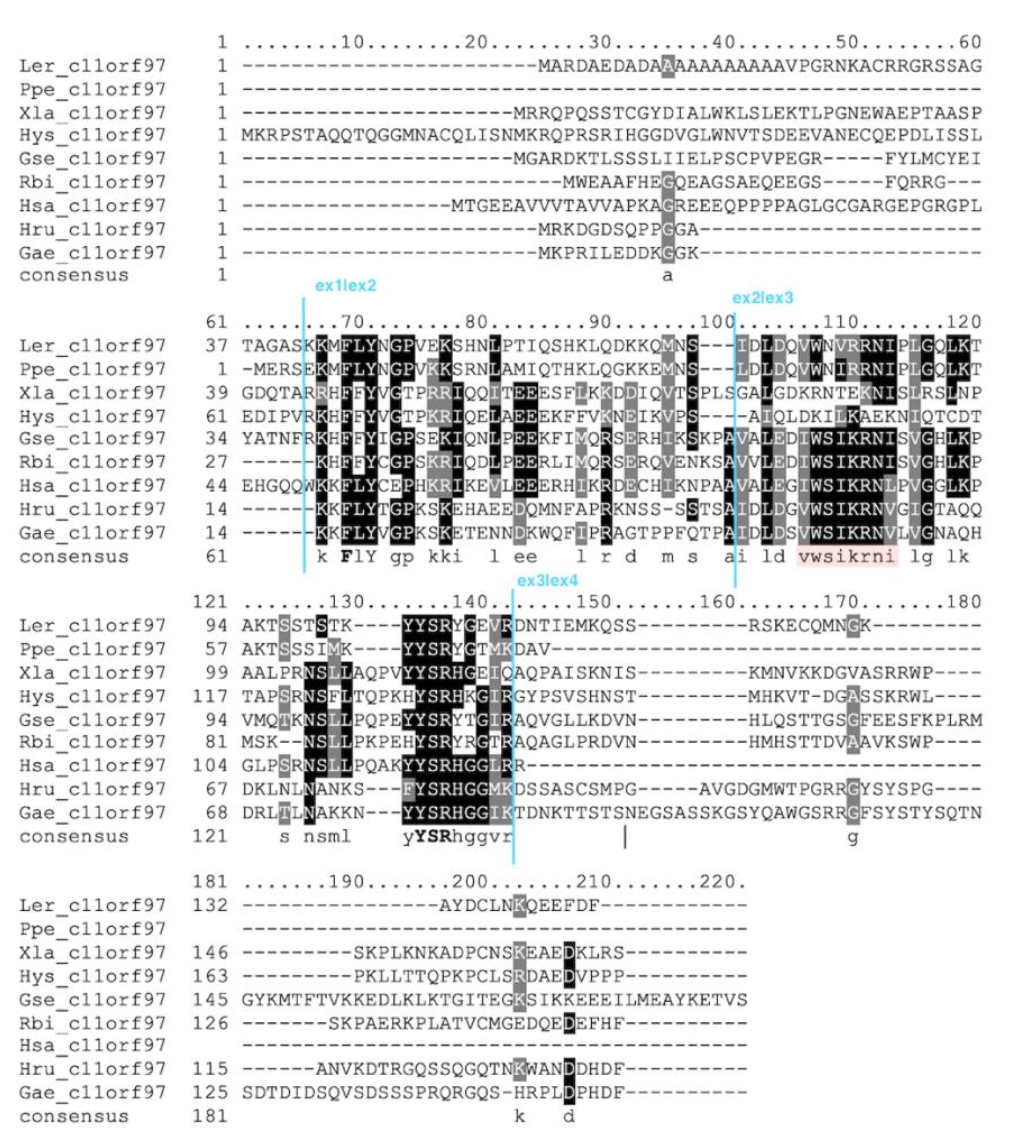
Annotated Multiple Sequence Alignment of Human C11ORF97 Protein and Distant Orthologs. The orthologs in this alignment are from amphibians, fish, and invertebrates. This alignment was made using ClustalW, and shading was done using BoxShade.5, 6 The 3 letter codes are as follows: Ler, Leucoraja erinacea; Ppe, Pristis pectinata; Xla, Xenopus laevis; Hys, Hyla sarda; Gse, Geotrypetes seraphini; Rbi, Rhinatrema bivittatum; Hsa, Homo sapiens; Hru, Haliotis rufescens; Gae, Gigantopelta aegis.

Table 2. Orthologs of Human C11ORF97. Compares orthologs from different groups. Sorted by date of divergence within groups, and then by sequence similarity.
group	genus, species	common name	taxonomic group	date of divergence (MYA)	accession number	sequence length (aa)	sequence identity (%)	sequence similarity (%)
Mammals	Homo sapiens	human	Primates	0	NP_001177391.1	126	100	100
	Mus musculus	mouse	Rodentia	87	NP_083582.2	121	71.4	77
	Ailuropoda melanoleuca	giant panda	Carnivora	94	XP_019648185.2	127	84.3	88.2
	Miniopterus natalensis	natal long-fingered bat	Chiroptera	94	XP_016062178.1	97	47.2	50
Aves	Apteryx rowi	okarito brown kiwi	Apterygiformes	319	XP_025927683	125	42.8	54.5
	Tinamus guttatus	white-throated tinamou	Tinamiformes	319	XP_010210901.1	120	34.2	49
	Apus apus	common swift	Apodiformes	319	XP_051500140	121	33.8	45.8
	Gallus gallus	chicken	Galliformes	319	XP_040517768.1	264	20.1	28.6
Reptiles	Terrapene carolina triunguis	three-toed box turtle	Testudines	319	XP_024064440.1	118	46.8	54.7
	Podarcis raffonei	aeolian wall lizard	Squamata	319	XP_053241613.1	121	42.7	52.4
	Crotalus tigris	tiger rattlesnake	Squamata	319	XP_039205026.1	133	40	53.8
	Caretta caretta	loggerhead-turtle	Testudines	319	XP_048699259.1	130	38.8	46.2
Amphibians	Rhinatrema bivittatum	two-lined caecilian	Gymnophiona	352	XP_029458218.1	149	26.6	36.2
	Geotrypetes seraphini	gaboon caecilian	Gymnophiona	352	XP_033805672.1	185	21.8	30.1
	Hyla sarda	sardinian tree frog	Anura	352	XP_056417471.1	184	19	27.5
	Xenopus laevis	african clawed frog	Anura	352	OCT93259.1	167	18	28.6
Fish	Leucoraja erinacea	little skate	Rajiformes	462	XP_055493278.1	144	19.8	30.5
	Pristis pectinata	small-tooth sawfish	Pristiformes	462	XP_051882720.1	77	19.5	35.9
Invertebrates	Haliotis rufescens	red abalone	Vetigastropoda	686	XP_046353937.1	139	16.7	26.9
	Gigantopelta aegis	deep sea snail	Neomphalina	686	XP_041350579.1	154	15.8	23

=== Paralogs ===
There were no paralogs found for human C11ORF97 protein.

== Clinical significance/pathology ==
Based on its protein interactions, it is predicted to have a role in Lemierre's syndrome and hepatic coma. C11ORF97 was also found to be closely related to ciliary movement, seen through multiple published papers. C11ORF97 was also mentioned in a published paper that dealt with the respiratory illnesses, COVID-19.
