= Septic embolism =

Type of embolism infected with bacteria resulting in the formation of pus

A septic embolism is a type of embolism that is infected with bacteria, resulting in the formation of pus. These may become dangerous if dislodged from their original location. Like other emboli, a septic embolism may be fatal.

One of the common microbes that can lead to widespread dissemination of septic emboli is Fusobacterium necrophorum, a Gram negative anaerobic bacillus. Fusobacteriota are commensal organisms in the oral cavity. F. necrophorum and F. nucleatum are the most important among the non-spore forming anaerobic bacilli in causing human infections. F. necroporum may occasionally cause septicaemia with metastatic abscesses (Lemierre's syndrome).

== Pathogenesis ==
Septic emboli most often originate from extrapulmonary locations which have been infected for a period of time. For example, a person's intravenous access site, which is used to insert intravenous drugs, may become infected. When present in great number, septic emboli can coalesce and mimick a lobar or bronchopneumonia. The infected site, combined with various coagulants that may be generated by the bacteria or the body, may then break off and enter the circulatory system, potentially causing a clot.

== Diagnosis ==
A septic embolism can be difficult to identify, as it is often attributed to other disorders or infections of the body. As a result, it may wreak havoc with CT scans. It can also be confused with lymph nodules, considering the similarity in shape and size. However, septic emboli usually lodge in the heart valves, where there are no lymph nodes.

== See also ==
- Arterial embolism
