= To Mega Therion =

To Mega Therion (/təˈmɛ.ɡɑːθiˈri.ən/, Greek: Τὸ Μέγα Θηρίον IPA: [to ˈme.ɣa θiˈri.on], lit. 'The Great Beast') may refer to:

- The Beast (Revelation), one of three beasts described in the Book of Revelation
- Aleister Crowley (1875–1947), also known as To Mega Therion, English occultist
- Therion (band), formerly named Megatherion, a Swedish symphonic metal band
  - "To Mega Therion", a song by Therion from the 1996 album Theli
- To Mega Therion (album), a 1985 album by Celtic Frost
- Tomegatherion, a fictional character in the video game Body Harvest

== See also ==
- Megatherium, an extinct genus of ground sloths
- Therion (disambiguation)
