= Blain (animal disease) =

Animal disease of unknown cause

Entry for Blain from Ephraim Chambers' 1728 Cyclopædia

Blain was an animal disease of unknown etiology that was well known in the 18th and 19th centuries. It is unclear whether it is still extant, or what modern disease it corresponds to.

According to Ephraim Chambers' 18th-century Cyclopaedia, or an Universal Dictionary of Arts and Sciences, blain was "a distemper" (in the archaic eighteenth-century sense of the word, meaning "disease") occurring in animals, consisting of a "Bladder growing on the Root of the Tongue against the Wind-Pipe", which "at length swelling, stops the Wind". It was thought to occur "by great chafing, and heating of the Stomach".

Blain is also mentioned in Cattle: Their Breeds, Management, and Diseases, published in 1836, where it is also identified as "gloss-anthrax". W. C. Spooner's 1888 book The History, Structure, Economy and Diseases of the Sheep also identifies blain as being the same as gloss-anthrax.

A description of blain is provided in the Horticulture column of the Monday Morning edition of the Belfast News-Letter, September 13, 1852. Headline: The Prevailing Epidemic Disease in Horned Cattle - The Mouth and Food Disease. "There are two diseases of the mouth - one of a very serious character, which is called blain (gloss anthrax) or inflammation of the tongue. This is a very virulent disease, and sometimes of a very rapid action, and which should be at once attended to, and not trifled with; but though it always exhibits itself in inflammation of the membranes of the mouth, beneath or above the tongue, and the sides of the tongue itself, it soon extends through the whole system, and, according to the best veterinarians, involves inflammation and gangrene of the oesophagus and intestines. The symptoms are many, the eyes are inflamed, and constantly weeping; swellings appear round the eyes and some other parts of the body; the pulse quick, heaving of the flanks, and the bowels sometimes constipated. Such are the general symptoms of this formidable disease, more or less aggravated by neglect of inattention in mitigation." It continues to describe treatment including deep lancing of blisters, blood letting, Epsom salt doses, chloride of lime rinses, tincture of diluted myrrh, fever treatments supplied in the animals feed, etc.

Modern scholarship suggests that "gloss-anthrax" was not the same disease as modern-day anthrax, but instead could have been foot-and-mouth disease, or a viral infection with a secondary Fusobacterium necrophorum infection. It has also been suggested that it may have been due to an extinct variant strain of true anthrax. Other sources also report epizootics known as "blain" or "black-blain" in the 13th and 14th centuries, but it is not clear if the disease involved was the same as "gloss-anthrax".
