= Therion =

Therion (Greek: θηρίον; "beast", "wild animal") may refer to:

- Therion (band), a Swedish metal band
- Therion (constellation), the name that the ancient Greeks gave to the constellation Lupus
- Therion (software), a cave cartography programme
- Therion (Thelema), a god in Thelema, consort of Babalon
- Therion (wasp), a genus of wasps
- The Beast (Revelation), a monster from the Book of Revelation

== See also ==
- Therian (disambiguation)
- Therien
- To Mega Therion (disambiguation)
