= Paragonimus skrjabini =

Scientific classification
- Kingdom: Animalia
- Phylum: Platyhelminthes
- Class: Trematoda
- Order: Plagiorchiida
- Family: Paragonimidae
- Genus: Paragonimus
- Species: P. skrjabini

Binomial name
- Paragonimus skrjabini Chen, 1959

Species of fluke

Paragonimus skrjabini is classified as a species in the genus Paragonimus, which consists of many species of lung flukes that result in the food-borne parasitic disease paragonimiasis.

== Introduction ==
Scientists have identified P. skrjabini, along with several other species including P. westermani and P. miyazakii, to be key pathogens in causing paragonimiasis in humans, primarily in Asian regions of the world. P. skrjabini is especially prevalent in 26 provinces in China with cases appearing more recently in India and Vietnam as well. From a morphological and genetic standpoint, P. skrjabini is most closely related to the species P. miyazakii, so much so that two sub-species have been classified separately within the P. skrjabini complex: P. skrjabini skrjabini and P. skrjabini miyazakii. Doanh PN (2007) establishes the importance of learning more about P. skrjabini, asserting that "among Paragonimus species, P. westermani followed by P. skrjabini complex are the major pathogens for human paragonimiasis in Asia."

== History ==
Max Braun in 1899 first defined the genus Paragonimus, which initially only included the species P. westermani.

In Vietnam, since paragonimiasis was first reported there in 1906, it was presumed for 89 years that only one species of Paragonimus lung fluke, P. westermani, caused paragonimiasis in humans. However, scientists have been conducting many studies of crabs and humans infected with paragonimiasis, leading to the discovery of several previously unknown species. The few cases reported in North America of paragonimiasis are most likely the result of diseased individuals traveling to the area from a different country or people consuming infected, imported food.

"P. skrjabini" is endemic in China and was first described in the Guangdong Province in 1959, originating from a viverrid's lungs.

Today, according to the World Health Organization, estimates put the number of persons afflicted with paragonimiasis at 20.7 million and the number at risk of contracting the disease at 293 million. For P. skrjabini, it stands as a public health threat in certain areas of the world, such as the Three Gorges Reservoir where it is the primary paragonimiasis causing parasite. Changes in the environment such as pollution and the persistence of individuals' consumption habits of raw crab puts paragonimiasis epidemics at high risk.

"Skrjabini" is named in honor of the Russian Helminthologist, Konstantin Skrjabin (1878–1972).

== Life Cycle ==
The life cycle of P. skrjabini involves three hosts. The first intermediate host is a mollusk (typically a snail), the second intermediate host is a crustacean (typically a crab), and the definitive host is a mammal such as a dog, cat, or a human. Among others, freshwater crab species of the genus Nanhaipotamon are known to be second intermediate hosts for P. skrjabini. The mammal is the definitive host because it is the site where sexual reproduction occurs and adult P. skrjabini flukes develop. Infection begins when humans consume raw or uncooked crustaceans such as crabs that contain metacercariae of P. skrjabini. P. skrjabini metacercarie are typically located in the muscles of the crabs's bodies (Zhang et al. 2012). Next, in the animal or human's small intestine, the metacercarie excyst (emerge from a cyst) and travel to the abdomen before ultimately moving into the lungs. There, adult worms begin to grow and develop. P. skrjabini in humans, however, are known to often fail to make it to the lungs and thus don't reach the stage of adult development. Rather, immature P. skrjabini parasites stay undeveloped and enter the human host's brain, muscles, and various other subcutaneous tissues, leading to extrapulmonary neurologic and abdominal paragonimiasis. P. skrjabini trematodes in the mammal produce and fertilize eggs that then exit the host, typically through feces. In water, the eggs hatch and release miracidium that in turn infect a snail. A sporocyst that contains germinal cells forms in the snail's body cavity, and, following asexual reproduction, produces rediae. Rediae produce cercariae (the larval form of the parasite). The cercariae migrate from the snail to a crab, entering either through direct penetration or by the consumption of the snail by the crab. Often, multiple species of Paragonimus can be found coexisting in one crustacean, suggesting that metacercariae of different species do not compete with each other within the host. The life cycle of P. skrjabini starts over again as mammals or humans eat the crab.

== Morphology ==
The encysted metacercaria of P. skrjabini tend to have a round and circular shape with a cyst wall that consists of a fragile outer later and thicker middle and inner layers. Excysted metacercariae of P. skrjabini have an oral sucker and a ventral sucker measuring 80-120 μm and 120-60 μm in diameter, respectively. The morphological characteristics of adult worms of P. skrjabini are an elongated body with scattered, singularly arranged cuticular spines, branched testes and ovaries, and a ventral sucker that is larger than the oral sucker. Due to the presence of both ovaries and testes in P. skrjabini parasites, they are hermaphroditic. An esophagus and truncated pharynx make up the adult digestive system.

== Symptoms and Diagnosis ==
In humans, P. skrjabini infections can result in a wide variety of symptoms, rendering it difficult to diagnose and challenging to quickly enact proper treatment. Diagnosis typically requires first a general recognition of the symptoms followed by laboratory and radiologic tests. Radiology, for example, can pick up on P. skrjabini's migration to ectopic places like the brain. Serological or immunological tests including intradermal test, immunodiffusion, indirect haemagglutination test, enzyme-linked immunosorbent assay, and Western blot also play a key role in not only diagnosing the overall presence of Paragonimus parasites in the body but also distinguishing the various different species invading. The ELISA test detects the antibody used to combat the P. skrjabini infection. Although cases of P. skrjabini infection can exhibit early symptoms such as abdominal pain, a lack of appetite, and high fever, it can also come on slowly and fail to exhibit identifiable symptoms for a period of latency between 20 days to as long as 3 months. Later on in the infection, the type of symptoms that appear primarily depends on which organs the P. skrjabini parasites enter. Infections and the resulting set of symptoms can be classified under five different types including the subcutaneous mass type, cerebral type, pericarditis type, abdominal type, and pleurisy type. Infections of the pleurisy type, for instance, exhibit symptoms like chest pain and cough while the cerebral type tends to result in vomiting and headaches. The pericarditis type is associated with shortness of breath and palpitation while the abdominal type infections lead to diarrhea and abdominal pain. P. skrjabini has shown no effect on mammalian reproductive abilities. Despite occasional cases resulting in death, P. skrjabini has not been widely known to cause morbidity and death. Surgery may be occasionally necessary for patients with cerebral or pleural paragonimiasis.

Children and young adults tend to show a higher rate of infection than adults.

== Genetic Sequencing and Studies ==
The ITS2 (nuclear ribosomal second internal transcribed spacer region) and CO1 (partial mitochondrial cytochrome oxidase subunit 1 gene) sequences of P. skrjabini have been registered in GenBank, which is used to determine similarities and phylogenetic relationships between various species of Paragonimus in different parts of the world. ITS2 sequences are utilized when studying inter-species variation, and CO1 sequences are important when studying intra-species variation. For instance, Doanh et al. (2012) determined that, after analyzing the CO1 sequences of groups of P. skrjabini in India, China, and Vietnam, a fair amount of genetic differences exist between the groups. Doanh et al. (2012) also used ITS2 and CO1 sequences to prove that populations of P. skrjabini in both Vietnam and China are the same genetically. Blair et al. (2005) studied CO1 sequences and found molecular similarities and differences in the P. skrjabini complex, concluding that there should be two sub-species of P. skrjabini.

Methods to study P. skrjabini consist of collecting samples of crabs to analyze how metacercarie is distributed in the body, purposefully infecting dogs in order to extract worms from it to later examine under a microscope, and various other tests and assays.

== Prevention and Treatment ==
First and foremost, health education is necessary in order to teach people the ways in which to evade infections of P. skrjabini. Through a survey of people in the Three Gorges Reservoir in China where P. skrjabini cases have appeared, Zhang et al. (2012) reported that out of a sampling of 724 people, the consumption rate of raw crab was 68.09%. And out of the 213 individuals that tested positive for P. skrjabini infection, every single one of them had consumed raw crab. Reasons behind this eating habit can be explained by the various culinary preferences and unique customs in the local area where Paragonimus species are endemic. But, people must be educated in ways that encourage fully cooking meals that contain crab and routinely washing their hands after handling any crustacean. In Korea, for instance, education proved to be successful in reducing the prevalence of paragonimiasis cases after people learned about proper eating habits, ways to reduce pollution, and the importance of not using crayfish juice in medicine. The same method can be applied in areas where P. skrjabini remains a health concern, for all it takes is cooking the crabs to kill the P. skrjabini parasite.

Praziquantel can be used to treat individuals infected with P. skrjabini parasites. Prazinquatal acts quickly to cure paragonimiasis, showing results after even one day, unlike the previously used drug bithionol, which required extended treatment and involved more severe side effects. The latest drug being investigated to treat paragonimiasis is triclabendazole.
