= André Lemierre =

French bacteriologist (1875–1956)

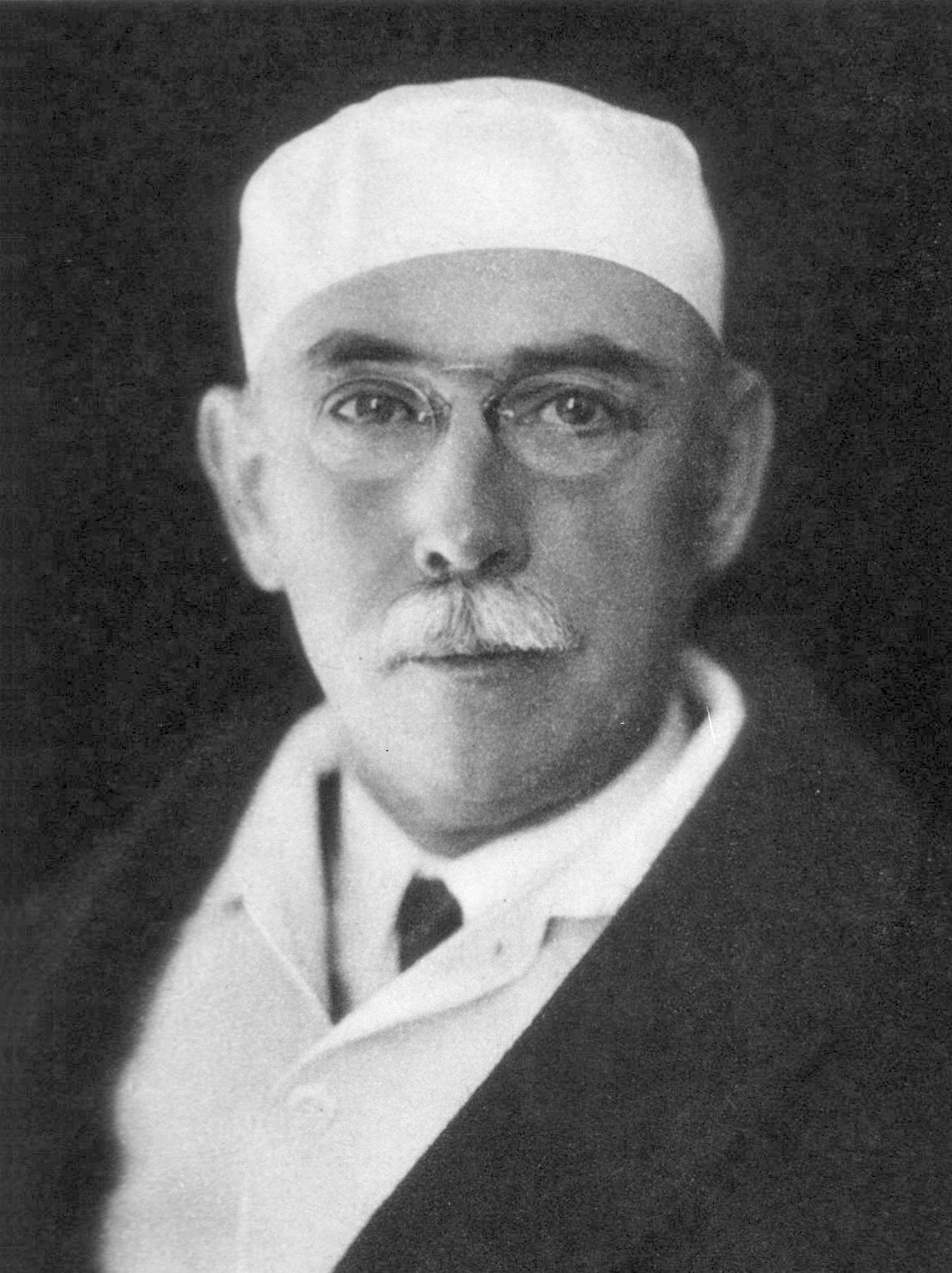
André-Alfred Lemierre

André-Alfred Lemierre (July 30, 1875 in Paris – 1956) was a French bacteriologist.

He studied in Paris where he became an externe in 1896, interne in 1900. He obtained his doctorate in 1904, became Médecin de Hôpitaux in 1912 and later worked in the Hôpital Bichat. He was habilitated in 1913 and in 1926 was promoted to professor of bacteriology. His works concern investigations on septicaemia, typhus, bilious and urine tract infections, kidney diseases, etc. He described Lemierre's syndrome in 1936 while working as a bacteriologist in the Claude Bernard Hospital in Paris.
