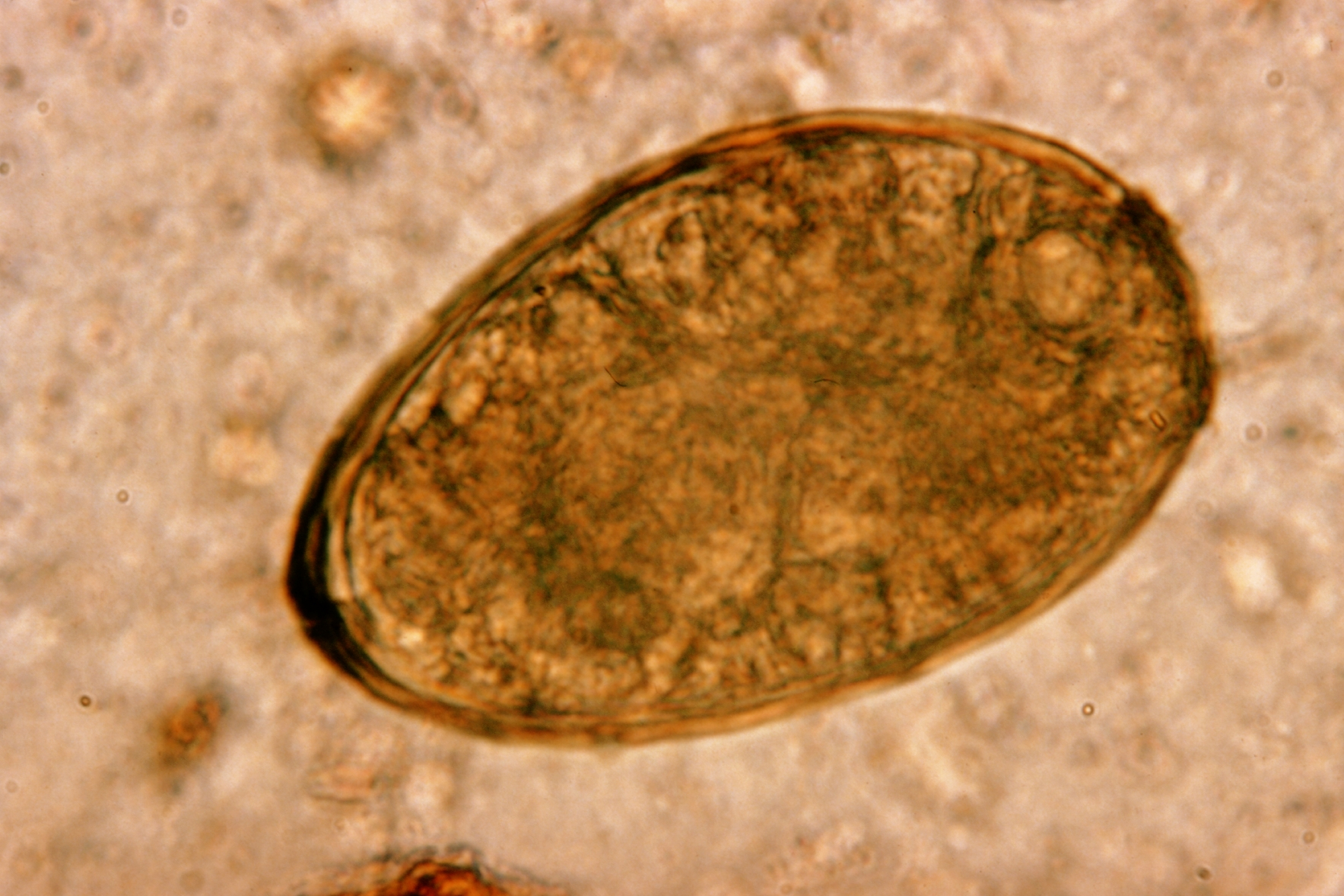
- Egg of Paragonimus westermani

Scientific classification
- Kingdom: Animalia
- Phylum: Platyhelminthes
- Class: Trematoda
- Order: Plagiorchiida
- Suborder: Xiphidiata
- Superfamily: Troglotrematoidea
- Family: Paragonimidae; Dollfus, 1939
- Genus: Paragonimus; Braun, 1899

Species
- Paragonimus africanus; Paragonimus caliensis; Paragonimus compactus; Paragonimus ecuadoriensis; Paragonimus heterotremus; Paragonimus hueitugensis; Paragonimus ichunensis; Paragonimus iloktsuenensis; Paragonimus kellicotti; Paragonimus mexicanus; Paragonimus miyazakii; Paragonimus ohirai; Paragonimus pulmonalis; Paragonimus peruvianus; Paragonimus sadoensis; Paragonimus skrjabini; Paragonimus uterobilateralis; Paragonimus westermani

= Paragonimus =

Genus of flukes

Paragonimus is a genus of flukes (trematodes) and is the only genus in the monotypic family Paragonimidae. Some tens of species have been described, but they are difficult to distinguish, so it is not clear how many of the named species may be synonyms. The name Paragonimus is derived from the combination of two Greek words, “para” (on the side of) and “gonimos” (gonads or genitalia). Several of the species are known as lung flukes. In humans some of the species occur as zoonoses; the term for the condition is paragonimiasis. The first intermediate hosts of Paragonimus include at least 54 species of freshwater snails from superfamilies Cerithioidea and Rissooidea.

The most prominent species of Paragonimus in human medicine is Paragonimus westermani, an infectious lung fluke originating in eastern Asia. Worldwide, about nine species of Paragonimus are known to cause human paragonimiasis in which many of the species reside in East Asia, West Africa, and in North and South America.

== Morphology ==
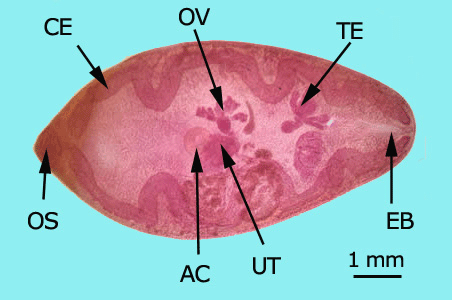
Morphology of typical Paragonimus: AC: acetabulum (ventral sucker) CE: cecum, EB: excretory bladder OS: oral sucker, OV: ovary TE: testes, UT: uterus

Species of Paragonimus vary in size; the adult stage might attain a length of up to 15 millimetres (0.59 in) and a width of up to 8 mm (0.31 in). The adult flatworm has an oval shape body with spines covering its thick tegument. Both the oral sucker and acetabulum are round and muscular. The acetabulum is slightly bigger than the oral sucker – 0.19 mm and 0.12 mm, respectively. Ovaries are located behind the acetabulum and posterior to the ovary are the testes. The seminal receptacle, the uterus and its metraterm, the thick-walled terminal part, lie between the acetabulum and the ovary.

== Life cycle ==
The parasite passes through two intermediate hosts, an aquatic snail and a crustacean. It enters its mammalian definitive hosts when they eat infected freshwater crustaceans. Typical hosts include dogs, cats, and humans. Humans usually contract paragonimiasis when they eat undercooked freshwater crabs (for instance species of the genus Nanhaipotamon) or crayfish, that contain live metacercariae. In the intestine, the parasite will move into the abdomen and commonly into the lungs. In the lung, the parasites encyst and cross fertilize each other. The cyst eventually ruptures in the lungs and the eggs may be coughed up or swallowed and excreted in the feces. An egg landing in fresh water hatches and releases a ciliated miracidium. A successful miracidium swims about until it finds an intermediate host, usually an aquatic snail. A crustacean in turn becomes infected by eating infected snails. The definitive host completes the cycle if it eats infected crustaceans.

== Epidemiology ==
Worldwide roughly 20 million people are infected with Paragonimus. Human infections are most common in regions with many human and animal reservoir hosts plus an abundance of intermediate hosts, such as snails, crabs, or crayfish, and where in addition consumption of raw or undercooked seafood is common. Consumption of insufficiently cooked meat from infected land animal hosts, such as wild boar, commonly transmits the infection. The domestic cat is a reservoir for a variety of lung flatworms and can transmit the infection to humans.

== Symptoms ==
Symptoms of paragonimiasis may include abdominal pain, diarrhea, fever, and hives. If the infection remains untreated, the symptoms may diminish or disappear after only few months, but sometimes they last for decades. Paragonimiasis is caused by the body's natural immune response to the worms and eggs that are present and also migrating from the intestines to the lungs.

As a rule, the parasites begin to cause symptoms about three weeks after ingesting live metacercariae. After about eight weeks, they begin to produce eggs in the lungs. Some patients develop brain damage if parasites establish in the brain and produce eggs. The brain damage commonly causes headache, vomiting, and seizures. Untreated cerebral paragonimaisis commonly results in death from increased intracranial pressure.

== Treatment ==
Praziquantel has been used to effectively treat paragonimiasis by separating the tegument. An effectively complete rate of cure may be expected after three days of treatment if there has not been too much permanent damage, such as from intracranial effects. Other medications can also be used such as bithionol, niclofan, and triclabendazole with high cure rates.

== Prevention ==
Thorough cooking of an infected crustacean kills all stages of the parasite. Crab meat should not be eaten raw, even if pickled, because the pickling solution often fails to kill all the parasites. Utensils and cutlery boards should be cleaned thoroughly before and after food preparation.
