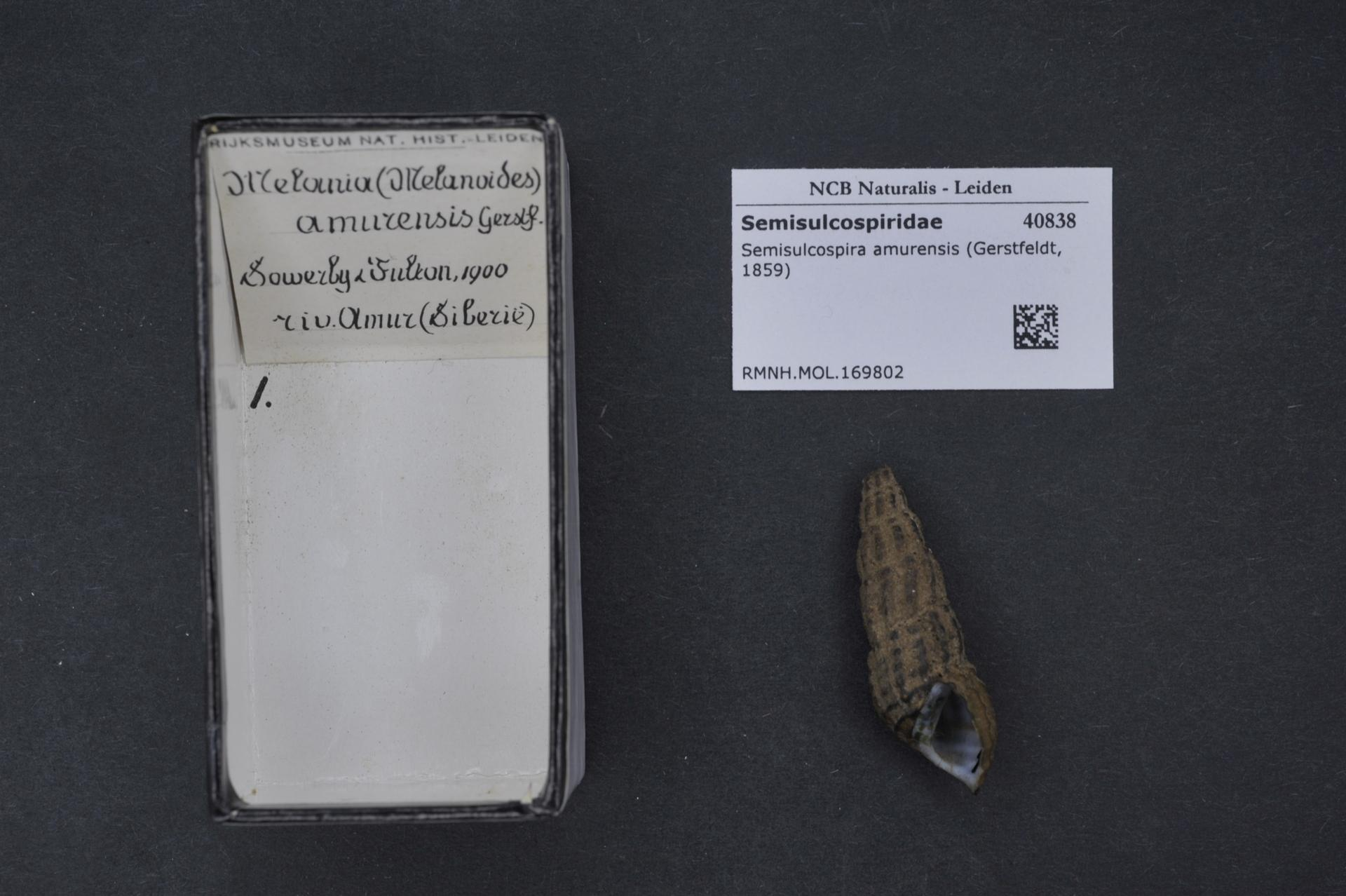
- Koreoleptoxis amurensis shell

Scientific classification
- Kingdom: Animalia
- Phylum: Mollusca
- Class: Gastropoda
- Subclass: Caenogastropoda
- Order: incertae sedis
- Family: Semisulcospiridae
- Genus: Koreoleptoxis
- Species: K. amurensis

Binomial name
- Koreoleptoxis amurensis (Gerstfeldt, 1859)

Synonyms
- Melania amurensis Gerstfeldt, 1859; Juga amurensis (Gerstfeldt, 1859) “Parajuga” amurensis Semisulcospira amurensis Semisulcospira cancellata sensu Shadin, 1952, part. non Benson, 1833

= Koreoleptoxis amurensis =

Species of gastropod

Koreoleptoxis amurensis is a species of freshwater snail with an operculum, an aquatic gastropod mollusk in the family Semisulcospiridae.

== Taxonomy ==
Strong et al. (2009) and Kantor et al. (2010) classified this species in the genus "Parajuga" Prozorova et Starobogatov, 2003; however Parajuga is not available name.

== Distribution ==
This species occurs in rivers of the Amur River basin.

The type locality is "im Amur, im mittleren Laufe und einem Theile des unteren dieses Stromes".

== Ecology ==
Koreoleptoxis amurensis serves as the first intermediate host for Clonorchis sinensis in China and as the first intermediate host of Paragonimus westermani.
