= Shapeshifters (board game) =

Board game

Shapeshifters is a board game that was published by Fat Messiah Games in 1991.

== Gameplay ==
Shapeshifters is a board game about a duel involving two magicians who are both adept at changing form.

== Reception ==
Scott Haring reviewed Shapeshifters in Pyramid Number 5 (Jan., 1994), and stated that "Overall, this is an inventive game that is easy to learn (but by no means easy to master) and takes less than an hour to play. The components are simple (but not too cheap), and [...] the game is a bargain. What more could you ask for?"
