= Metamorph (disambiguation) =

Metamorph may refer to:

- A shapeshifter in folklore and fiction
- The Metamorph, an episode of the sci-fi series Space: 1999
- MetaMorph: Dungeon Creatures, a 2017 video game by Firefly Studios
- Metamorphs, aliens in the 1984 comic The Liberators (comic)

== In music ==
- Metamorph, a musical duo composed of Margot Day and Kurtis Knight
- "Metamorph", a track on the 1998 album Infinity (Devin Townsend album)
- Metamorph, a 2003 album by Mankind Is Obsolete
- "Metamorph", a 2011 track by Darin Epsilon and Tom Sela
- Metamorph, a 2019 album by John Sloman
- "Metamorph", a 2020 single by Oceans Ate Alaska
- Metamorph, a 2022 album by The Score
- Metamorph (tour), a concert tour by South Korean singer Taemin

== See also ==
- Metamorphosis (disambiguation)
- Metamorphism, the change of minerals in rocks
- Metamorphic rock, rock subjected to heat and pressure
- Metamorphosis, a profound change in animal's body structure
- Shapeshifter (disambiguation)
- Therianthropy (disambiguation)
