= ShapeShifter (animation) =

ShapeShifter is an online animation freeware developed by Aniboom, aimed at providing users with a platform to create short movies without the need for downloading or installing any software. Launched to simplify the animation process and make it more accessible, ShapeShifter offers a user-friendly interface and a range of features to facilitate animation creation.

Shapeshifter is an online animation tool that enables users to create short movies directly through their web browser. The platform offers a simplified interface and basic shapes for users to work with, allowing for the creation of animations without extensive technical knowledge.

== Features ==
The software provides features, such as:

- Online Platform: Shapeshifter is a web-based application, allowing users to create animations without the need for downloading or installing software.
- Basic Shapes: Users have access to four basic shapes to create animations.
- Color: Users can choose and apply colors to shapes to enhance their animations.
- Resizing and Scaling Shapes: Shapes can be resized and scaled to create dynamic animations.
- View Outlines: Users have the option to view outlines of shapes for precise editing.
- View Onion Skinning: Shapeshifter offers onion skinning functionality, allowing users to see previous and next frames for reference.
- Adding Frames: Users can add frames to their animations to create sequences.
- Playback of Animation: The platform supports playback of animations, allowing users to preview their creations.
- Saving Animation: Users can save their animations for future editing or sharing.
- Changing the Background Color: Users have the option to change the background color of their animations to suit their preferences.

== Drawbacks ==
Given the nature of the software, creating an animation can become tedious or slow. Because of this, many animations are very short and lack detail but some users have created impressive animations using the application.
