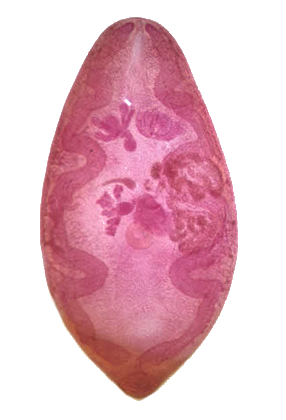
- An adult specimen stained with carmine

Scientific classification
- Kingdom: Animalia
- Phylum: Platyhelminthes
- Class: Trematoda
- Order: Plagiorchiida
- Family: Paragonimidae
- Genus: Paragonimus
- Species: P. westermani

Binomial name
- Paragonimus westermani Kerbert, 1878

Subspecies
- P. westermani filipinus P. westermani ichunencis P. westermani japonicus P. westermani westermani

= Paragonimus westermani =

Species of fluke

Paragonimus westermani (Japanese lung fluke or oriental lung fluke) is the most common species of lung fluke that infects humans, causing paragonimiasis. Human infections are most common in eastern Asia and in South America. Paragonimiasis may present as a sub-acute to chronic inflammatory disease of the lung. It was discovered by Dutch zoologist Coenraad Kerbert in 1878.

== Causative agent ==
More than 30 species of trematodes (flukes) of the genus Paragonimus have been reported to infect animals and humans. Among the more than 10 species reported to infect humans, the most common is Paragonimus westermani, the oriental lung fluke.

== Morphology ==
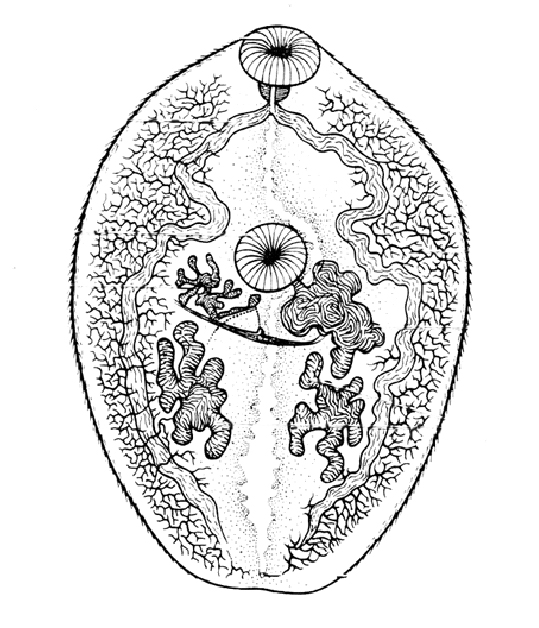
Paragonimus westermani. An adult of the hermaphroditic generation.

In size, shape, and color, Paragonimus westermani resembles a coffee bean when alive. Adult worms are 7.5 mm to 12 mm long and 4 mm to 6 mm wide. The thickness ranges from 3.5 mm to 5 mm. The skin of the worm (tegument) is thickly covered with scalelike spines. The oral and ventral suckers are similar in size, with the latter placed slightly pre-equatorially. The excretory bladder extends from the posterior end to the pharynx. The lobed testes are adjacent from each other located at the posterior end, and the lobed ovaries are off-centered near the center of the worm (slightly postacetabular). The uterus is located in a tight coil to the right of the acetabulum, which is connected to the vas deferens. The vitelline glands, which produce the yolk for the eggs, are widespread in the lateral field from the pharynx to the posterior end. Inspection of the tegumental spines and shape of the metacercariae may distinguish between the 30-odd species of Paragonimus spp. but the distinction is sufficiently difficult to justify suspicion that many of the described species are synonyms.

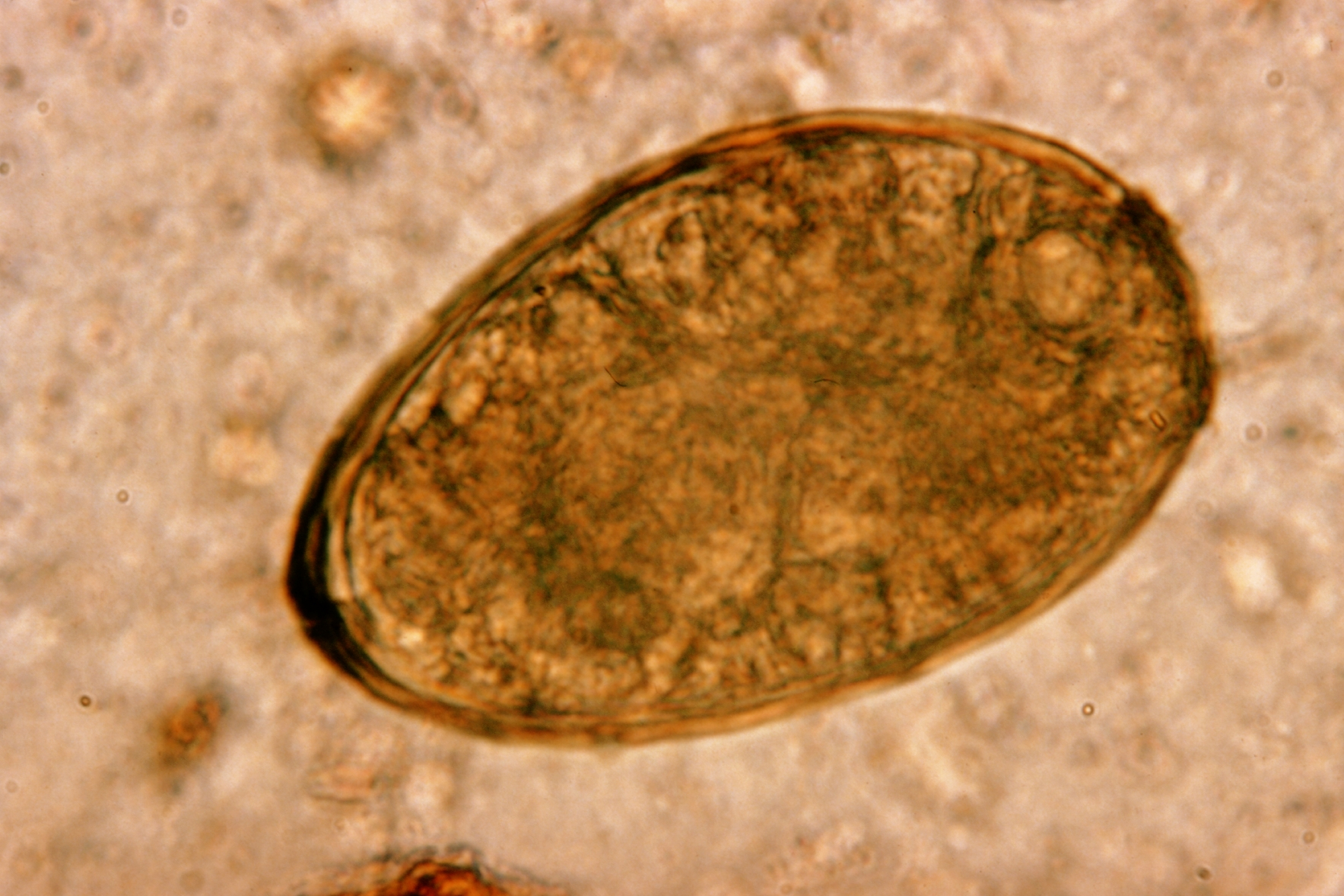
Egg of Paragonimus westermani

- Eggs: Paragonimus westermani eggs range from 80 to 120 μm long by 45 to 70 μm wide. They are yellow-brown, ovoid or elongate, with a thick shell, and often asymmetrical with one end slightly flattened. At the large end, the operculum is clearly visible. The opposite (abopercular) end is thickened. The eggs are unembryonated when passed in sputum or feces.
- Cercaria (not shown): Cercariae are often indistinguishable between species. There is a large posterior sucker, and the exterior is spined.
- Metacercaria: Metacercariae are usually encysted in tissue. The exterior is spined and has two suckers
- Adults: Adult flukes are typically reddish-brown and ovoid, measuring 7 to 16 mm by 4 to 8 mm, similar in size and appearance to a coffee bean. They are hermaphroditic, with a lobed ovary located anterior to two branching testes. Like all members of the Trematoda, they possess oral and ventral suckers.

== Discovery ==
Paragonimus westermani was discovered when two Bengal tigers died of paragonimiasis in zoos in Europe in 1878. Several years later, infections in humans were recognised in Formosa (present-day Taiwan).

P. westermani was discovered in the lungs of a human by Ringer in 1879 and eggs in the sputum were recognized independently by Manson and Erwin von Baelz in 1880. Manson proposed the snail as an intermediate host and various Japanese scientists detailed the whole life cycle in the snail between 1916 and 1922. The species name P. westermani was named after Pieter Westerman (1859–1925), a zookeeper who noted the trematode in a Bengal tiger in an Amsterdam Zoo[Artis].

== Life cycle ==
Unembryonated eggs are passed in the sputum of a human or feline. Two weeks later, miracidia develop in the egg and hatches. The miracidia penetrate its first intermediate host (snail). Within the snail mother sporocyst form and produce many mother rediae, which subsequently produce many daughter rediae which shed crawling cercariae into freshwater. The crawling cercariae penetrate freshwater crabs and encyst in its muscles becoming metacercaria. Humans or felines then eat the infected crabs raw. Once eaten, the metacercaria excysts and penetrates the gut, diaphragm and lung where it becomes an adult worm in pairs.

The first intermediate hosts of the Paragonimus westermani are freshwater snails:

- Koreoleptoxis amurensis
- Semisulcospira calculus
- Semisulcospira cancellata
- Semisulcospira extensa
- Semisulcospira gottschei
- Semisulcospira libertina – synonym: Semisulcospira toucheana
- Semisulcospira mandarina – synonym: Semisulcospira wegckiangensis
- Semisulcospira multicincta
- Semisulcospira nodiperda
- Semisulcospira nodiperda quinaria
- Semisulcospira paucincta
- Semisulcospira peregrinomum

For many years Tarebia granifera was believed to be an intermediate host for the Paragonimus westermani, but Michelson showed in 1992 that this was erroneous.

Paragonimus has a quite complex life-cycle that involves two intermediate hosts as well as humans. Eggs first develop in water after being expelled by coughing (unembryonated) or being passed in human feces. In the external environment, the eggs become embryonated. In the next stage, the parasite miracidia hatch and invades the first intermediate host such as a species of freshwater snail. Miracidia penetrate its soft tissues and go through several developmental stages inside the snail but mature into cercariae in 3 to 5 months. Cercariae next invade the second intermediate host such as crabs or crayfish and encyst to develop into metacercariae within 2 months. Infection of humans or other mammals (definitive hosts) occurs via consumption of raw or undercooked crustaceans. Human infection with P. westermani occurs by eating inadequately cooked or pickled crab or crayfish that harbor metacercariae of the parasite. The metacercariae excyst in the duodenum, penetrate through the intestinal wall into the peritoneal cavity, then through the abdominal wall and diaphragm into the lungs, where they become encapsulated and develop into adults. The worms can also reach other organs and tissues, such as the brain and striated muscles, respectively. However, when this takes place completion of the life cycles is not achieved, because the eggs laid cannot exit these sites.

== Epidemiology ==
Reservoir hosts of Paragonimus spp. include numerous species of carnivores including felids, canids, viverrids, mustelids, some rodents and pigs. Humans become infected after eating raw freshwater crabs or crayfish that have been encysted with the metacerciaria. Southeast Asia is more predominately more infected because of lifestyles. Raw seafood is popular in these countries. Crab collectors string raw crabs together and bring them miles inland to sell in Taiwan markets. These raw crabs are then marinated or pickled in vinegar or wine to coagulate the crustacean muscle. This method of preparation does not kill the metacercariae, consequently infecting the host. Smashing rice-eating crabs in rice paddies, splashing juices containing metacercariae, can also transmit the parasite, or using juices strained from fresh crabs for medicinal uses. This parasite is easily spread because it is able to infect other animals (zoonosis). An assortment of mammals and birds can be infected and act as paratenic hosts. Ingestion of the paratenic host can lead to infection of this parasite.

Paragonimus westermani is distributed in southeast Asia and Japan. Other species of Paragonimus are common in parts of Asia, Africa and South and Central America. P. westermani has been increasingly recognized in the United States because of the increase of immigrants from endemic areas such as Southeast Asia and is estimated to infect 23 million people worldwide.

== Transmission ==
Transmission of the parasite P. westermani to humans and mammals primarily occurs through the consumption of raw or undercooked seafood. In Asia, an estimated 80% of freshwater crabs carry P. westermani. In preparation, live crabs are crushed and metacercariae may contaminate the fingers/utensils of the person preparing the meal. Accidental transfer of infective cysts can occur via food preparers who handle raw seafood and subsequently contaminate cooking utensils and other foods. Consumption of animals that feed on crustaceans can also transmit the parasite, for cases have been cited in Japan where raw boar meat was the source of human infection. Food preparation techniques such as pickling and salting do not exterminate the causative agent. For example, in a Chinese study eating "drunken crabs" was shown to be particularly risky because the infection rate was 100% when crabs are immersed in wine for 3–5 minutes and fed to cats/dog.

== Reservoir ==
Animals such as rodents, pigs, dogs, and a variety of feline species can also harbor P. westermani.

== Vector ==
There is no vector, but various snail and crab species serve as intermediate hosts. In Japan and Korea, the crab species Eriocheir is an important item of food as well as a notable second intermediate host of the parasite.

== Incubation period ==
Time from infection to oviposition (laying eggs) is 65 to 90 days. Infections may persist for 20 years in humans.

== Pathology ==
Once in the lung or ectopic site, the worm stimulates an inflammatory response that allows it to cover itself in granulation tissue forming a capsule. These capsules can ulcerate and heal over time. The eggs in the surrounding tissue become pseudotubercles. If the worm becomes disseminated and gets into the spinal cord, it can cause paralysis; capsules in the heart can cause death. The symptoms are localized in the pulmonary system, which include a bad cough, bronchitis, and blood in sputum (hemoptysis).

== Diagnosis ==
Diagnosis is based on microscopic demonstration of eggs in stool or sputum, but these are not present until 2 to 3 months after infection. However, eggs are also occasionally encountered in effusion fluid or biopsy material. Furthermore, you can use morphologic comparisons with other intestinal parasites to diagnose potential causative agents. Finally, antibody detection is useful in light infections and in the diagnosis of extrapulmonary paragonimiasis. In the United States, detection of antibodies to Paragonimus westermani has helped physicians differentiate paragonimiasis from tuberculosis in Indochinese immigrants.

Additionally, radiological methods can be used to X-ray the chest cavity and look for worms. This method is easily misdiagnosed, because pulmonary infections look like tuberculosis, pneumonia, or spirochaetosis. A lung biopsy can also be used to diagnose this parasite.

== Management and treatment ==
According to the CDC, praziquantel is the drug of choice to treat paragonimiasis. The recommended dosage of 75 mg/kg per day, divided into 3 doses over 3 days has proven to eliminate P. westermani. Bithionol is an alternative drug for treatment of this disease but is associated with skin rashes and urticaria. For additional information, see the recommendations in The Medical Letter (Drugs for Parasitic Infections).

== Clinical presentation in humans ==
Case study:

An 11½-year-old Hmong Laotian boy was brought into the emergency room by his parents with a 2- to 3-month history of decreasing stamina and increasing dyspnea [shortness of breath] on exertion. He described an intermittent nonproductive cough and decreased appetite and was thought to have lost weight. He denied fever, chills, night sweats, headache, palpitations, hemoptysis [coughing up blood], chest pain, vomiting, diarrhea or urticaria [skin rash notable for dark red, raised, itchy bumps]. There were no pets at home. At the time of immigration to the United States 16 months earlier, all family members had negative purified protein derivative intradermal tests except one brother, who was positive but had a normal chest radiograph and subsequently received isoniazid for 12 months... a left lateral thoracotomy was performed during which 1800 ml of an odorless, cloudy, pea soup-like fluid containing a pale yellow, cottage cheese-like, proteinaceous material was removed, along with a solitary, 6-mm-long, reddish-brown fluke subsequently identified as Paragonimus westermani

Human infection with Paragonimus may cause acute or chronic symptoms, and manifestations may be either pulmonary or extrapulmonary.

Acute symptoms: The acute phase (invasion and migration) may be marked by diarrhea, abdominal pain, fever, cough, urticaria, hepatosplenomegaly, pulmonary abnormalities, and eosinophilia. The acute stage corresponds to the period of invasion and migration of flukes and consists of abdominal pain, diarrhea and urticaria, followed roughly 1 to 2 weeks later by fever, pleuritic chest pain, cough and/or dyspnea. Chronic Symptoms: During the chronic phase, pulmonary manifestations include cough, expectoration of discolored sputum, hemoptysis, and chest radiographic abnormalities. Chronic pulmonary paragonimiasis, the most common clinical pattern, is frequently mild, with chronic cough, brown-tinged sputum (the color being caused by expectorated clusters of reddish-brown eggs rather than by blood) and true hemoptysis.

== Confusion with tuberculosis ==
Practitioners should always consider the possibility of tuberculosis in patients with fevers, coughs, and weight loss. However, in endemic areas, it is prudent to consider paragonimiasis as well. Flukes occasionally cause confusion when they invade the pleural space without entering the lung parenchyma.

"In contrast to tuberculosis, pulmonary paragonimiasis is only rarely accompanied by rales or other adventitious breath sounds. Many patients are asymptomatic, and symptomatic patients frequently look well despite a prolonged course."

In pleural paragonimiasis, symptoms may be minimal and diagnosis complicated, since ova are not coughed or spit out or swallowed and there is frequently no cough. Such patients may develop pleural effusions and, because of the coendemicity with Mycobacterium tuberculosis (and co-infection in some patients), such effusions are often misdiagnosed as isolated tuberculosis.

- Adapted from Heath, Harley W & Susan G Marshall. "Pleural Paragonimiasis In A Laotian Child.*

Extra-pulmonary locations of the adult worms result in more severe manifestations, especially when the brain is involved. Extra-pulmonary paragonimiasis is rarely seen in humans, as the worms nearly exclusively migrate to the lungs. Despite this, cysts can develop in the brain and abdominal adhesions resulting from infection have been reported. Cysts may contain living or dead worms; a yellow-brownish thick fluid (occasionally hemorrhagic). When the worm dies or escapes, the cysts gradually shrink, leaving nodules of fibrous tissues and eggs that can calcify.

Worldwide the most common cause of hemoptysis is paragonimiasis.

Other case studies:

- Pachucki et al. 1984, "American paragonimiasis treated with Praziquantel"
- Procop et al. 2000, "North American Paragonimiasis: A case report"

== Public health and prevention strategies ==
Prevention programs should promote more hygienic food preparation by encouraging safer cooking techniques and more sanitary handling of potentially contaminated seafood. The elimination of the first intermediate host, the snail, is not tenable due to the nature of the organisms habits. A key component to prevention is research, more specifically the research of everyday behaviors. This recent study was conducted as a part of a broader effort to determine the status of Paragonimus species infection in Laos. An epidemiological survey was conducted on villagers and schoolchildren in Namback District between 2003 and 2005. Among 308 villagers and 633 primary and secondary schoolchildren, 156 villagers and 92 children had a positive reaction on a Paragonimus skin test. Consequently, several types of crabs were collected from markets and streams in a paragonimiasis endemic area for the inspection of metacercariae and were identified as the second intermediate host of the Paragonimus species. In this case study, we see how high prevalence of paragonimiasis is explained by dietary habits of the population. Amongst schoolchildren, many students reported numerous experiences of eating roast crabs in the field. Adult villagers reported frequent consumption of seasoned crabs (Tan Cheoy Koung) and papaya salad (Tammack Koung) with crushed raw crab. In addition to this characteristic feature of the villagers' food culture, the denizens of this area drink fresh crab juice as a traditional cure for measles, and this was also thought to constitute a route for infection.

== See also ==
- List of parasites (human)
