= Paragonimus kellicotti =

Scientific classification
- Kingdom: Animalia
- Phylum: Platyhelminthes
- Class: Trematoda
- Order: Plagiorchiida
- Family: Paragonimidae
- Genus: Paragonimus
- Species: P. kellicotti

Binomial name
- Paragonimus kellicotti Ward, 1908

Species of fluke

Paragonimus kellicotti, the North American lung fluke, is a species of parasitic trematode in the genus Paragonimus. This species of Paragonimus is not believed to employ paratenic hosts, (Note: It has been suggested that rats may act as a paratenic host based on experimental infections.) instead progressing directly to a mammal definitive host that ingested an infected crustacean. It is believed to be endemic to North America, but has been reported in a dog in Israel.

== Morphology ==
Paragonimus kellicotti parasites have dorsoventrally flattened, brown, oval-shaped bodies. They are soft-bodied parasites with oral and ventral suckers that are relatively similar in size. They use their ventral suckers to attach to a host. Their tegument is covered with spines, whose morphology and occurrence in groups help distinguish P. kellicotti from other Paragonimus species. Lung flukes are hermaphroditic, having both the female and male organs. Thus, they are able to self-fertilize.

== Habitat ==
Early larval stages are found in snails and later move on to crustaceans, primarily crawfish, becoming encysted metacercariae. Examples of first intermediate host species include Pomatiopsis cincinnatiensis, P. lapidaria and Elimia potosiensis. Second intermediate host species include Cambarus spp., Orconectes propinquus, Orconectes rusticus, Procambarus blandingii acutus and Procambarus clarkii. Experimental infection of Geothelphusa dehaani has been reported. P. kellicotti may be found within hosts of rivers, swamps and forest areas.

== Development ==
Lung fluke eggs are passed through feces after being swallowed or are expectorated in sputum. Eggs then hatch into miracidia after a variable period of environmental embryonation, often lasting a few weeks. A miracidium infects the first intermediate host, snails. Within snails, the miracidium develops into a cercaria. The cercariae eventually leave the snail and infect the second intermediate host, crustaceans. The lung fluke encysts within the tissue of crustaceans until the crustacean is consumed by humans or other animals. Once the fluke has been ingested, enzymes within the digestive tract of the consumer break down the parasitic cysts. After excystment, the fluke's larvae will travel from the intestines through the peritoneal cavity and diaphragm until they reach the lungs. The immature parasite continues to mature within the lungs of its new host and lay eggs. Mature lung flukes may breed year-round. P. kellicotti may live up to 20 years within a human host.

== Infection ==
Foodborne trematodiases, of which paragonimiasis is an example, are considered to be a neglected tropical disease by the World Health Organization. There are over ten species of Paragonimus implicated in human infections worldwide. However, humans rarely become infected with Paragonimus kellicotti in North America, presumably attributable to infrequent use of raw crayfish in local diets. Humans become infected with the parasite by eating raw or undercooked crayfish meat that contains parasite larvae. The frequent definitive hosts in North America are small animals that feed on crayfish, such as skunks, raccoons and mink. Dogs and cats may become infected and serve as an important reservoir of infection. If these animals are left without treatment, they eventually die.

== Signs of infection ==
Several diagnostic signs indicate a lung fluke infection. These include a cough, fever, and weight loss. Pleural effusion, a condition in which a surplus of fluid accumulates around the lungs, is another sign of an infection. P. kellicotti infection may sometimes be misdiagnosed as tuberculosis. However, a lung fluke infection is differentiated from tuberculosis by increased eosinophils in the blood and pleural fluid.

== Treatment ==
A P. kellicottii treatment in humans consists of oral medication of praziquantel over a minimum of three days to achieve a 100% cure rate when the parasite is located in the lungs. Other ectopic infections may require surgical removal. Surgery does not guarantee all larvae will be removed.
