= Fusobacterium necrophorum =

Scientific classification
- Domain: Bacteria
- Kingdom: Fusobacteriati
- Phylum: Fusobacteriota
- Class: Fusobacteriia
- Order: Fusobacteriales
- Family: Fusobacteriaceae
- Genus: Fusobacterium
- Species: F. necrophorum

Binomial name
- Fusobacterium necrophorum (Flügge 1886) Moore and Holdeman 1969

Species of bacterium

Fusobacterium necrophorum is a species of anaerobic, gram-negative bacteria responsible for Lemierre's syndrome. It has also been known to cause sinusitis, mastoiditis, and odontogenic infections.

== Biology ==
F. necrophorum is a rod-shaped species of Gram-negative bacteria. It is an obligate anaerobe and is a common inhabitant of the alimentary tract within humans and animals.

== Pathogenicity ==
F. necrophorum is responsible for 10% of acute sore throats, 21% of recurrent sore throats and 23% of peritonsillar abscesses with the remainder being caused by Group A streptococci or viruses. Other complications from F. necrophorum include meningitis, complicated by thrombosis of the internal jugular vein, thrombosis of the cerebral veins, and infection of the urogenital and the gastrointestinal tracts.

Although this infection is rare, researchers agree that this diagnosis should be considered in a septicaemic patient with thrombosis in an unusual site, and underlying malignancy should be excluded in cases of confirmed F. necrophorum occurring at sites caudal to the head.

The above statistical analysis is dated, necessarily. A 2015 study of young adult students presenting to a single clinic in Alabama had F. necrophorum as the predominant causative organism for pharyngitis 21% of the time (and found in 9% of asymptomatic students). In the same study, Group A Streptococcus was found in 10% of pharyngitis patients (1% of asymptomatic students).

=== Treatment ===
F. necrophorum infection (also called F-throat) usually responds to treatment with augmentin or metronidazole, but penicillin treatment for persistent pharyngitis appears anecdotally to have a higher relapse rate, although the reasons are unclear.

=== Infection in animals ===
This bacterium has been found to be associated with the foot disease thrush in horses. Thrush is a common infection that occurs on the hoof of a horse, specifically in the region of the frog. F. necrophorum occurs naturally in the animal's environment, especially in wet, muddy, or unsanitary conditions, such as an unclean stall. Horses with deep clefts, or narrow or contracted heels are more at-risk to develop thrush.

F. necrophorum is also a cause for lameness in sheep. Its infection is commonly called scald or foot rot. This species can persist for several years on land used by either sheep or cattle, and is found on most land of this type throughout the world. Due to its survival length in these areas, it is unrealistic to try to remove it. Sheep most often get scald due to breakage or weakness of the skin surrounding the hoof. This can occur due to strong footbaths, sandy soils, mild frostbite, or prolongened waterlogging of a field, and results in denaturing of the skin between the cleats.

F. necrophorum is the cause of necrotic laryngitis ("calf diphtheria") and liver abscesses in cattle.

See also Blain, an archaic disease of uncertain etiology.
