= Lemierre's syndrome =

Medical condition

- Other names: Septic phlebitis of the internal jugular vein, postanginal sepsis secondary to oropharyngeal infection, postanginal shock including sepsis, Lemierre's disease, human necrobacillosis
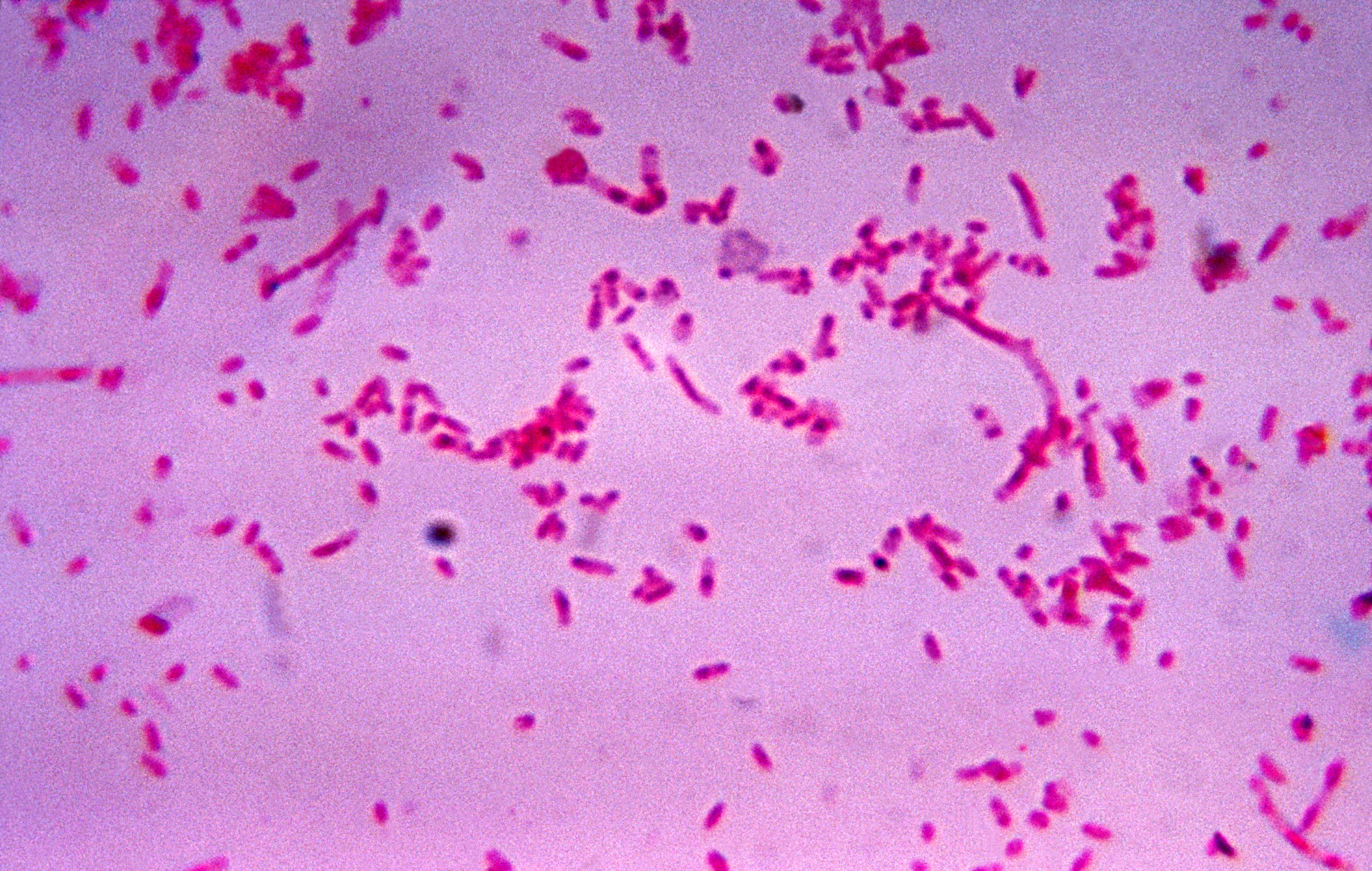
- Fusobacterium necrophorum, the most common cause of Lemierre's syndrome
- Specialty: Infectious diseases, veterinary medicine
- Symptoms: Early: Fever, sore throat, fatigue Later: Variable, sepsis, vomiting, muscle pain, meningitis, hepatosplenomegaly
- Complications: Septic shock, kidney failure, liver failure, cerebral edema, organ failure, death

Lemierre's syndrome is infectious thrombophlebitis of the internal jugular vein. It most often develops as a complication of a bacterial sore throat infection in young, otherwise healthy adults. The thrombophlebitis is a serious condition and may lead to further systemic complications such as bacteria in the blood or septic emboli.

Lemierre's syndrome occurs most often when a bacterial (e.g., Fusobacterium necrophorum) throat infection progresses to the formation of a peritonsillar abscess. Deep in the abscess, anaerobic bacteria can flourish. When the abscess wall ruptures internally, the drainage carrying bacteria seeps through the soft tissue and infects the nearby structures. Spread of infection to the nearby internal jugular vein provides a gateway for the spread of bacteria through the bloodstream. The inflammation surrounding the vein and compression of the vein may lead to blood clot formation. Pieces of the potentially infected clot can break off and travel through the right heart into the lungs as emboli, blocking branches of the pulmonary artery that carry deoxygenated blood from the right side of the heart to the lungs.

Sepsis following a throat infection was first described by Hugo Schottmüller in 1918. In 1936, André Lemierre published a series of 20 cases where throat infections were followed by identified anaerobic sepsis, of whom 18 died.

== Signs and symptoms ==
The signs and symptoms of Lemierre's syndrome vary, but usually start with a sore throat, fever, and general body weakness. These are followed by extreme lethargy, spiked fevers, rigors, swollen cervical lymph nodes, and a swollen, tender or painful neck. Often there is abdominal pain, diarrhea, nausea and vomiting during this phase. These signs and symptoms usually occur several days to two weeks after the initial symptoms. Symptoms of pulmonary involvement can be shortness of breath, cough and painful breathing (pleuritic chest pain). Rarely, blood is coughed up. Painful or inflamed joints can occur when the joints are involved.

Septic shock can also arise. This presents with low blood pressure, increased heart rate, decreased urine output and an increased rate of breathing. Some cases will also present with meningitis, which will typically manifest as neck stiffness, headache and sensitivity of the eyes to light. Liver enlargement and spleen enlargement can be found, but are not always associated with liver or spleen abscesses. Other signs and symptoms that may occur:

- Headache (unrelated to meningitis)
- Memory loss
- Muscle pain
- Jaundice
- Decreased ability to open the jaw
- Crepitations are sometimes heard over the lungs
- Pericardial friction rubs as a sign of pericarditis (rare)
- Cranial nerve paralysis and Horner's syndrome (both rare)

== Causes ==
The bacteria causing the thrombophlebitis are anaerobic bacteria that are typically normal components of the microorganisms that inhabit the mouth and throat. Species of Fusobacterium, specifically Fusobacterium necrophorum, are most commonly the causative bacteria, but various bacteria have been implicated. One 1989 study found that 81% of Lemierres's syndrome had been infected with Fusobacterium necrophorum, while 11% were caused by other Fusobacterium species. MRSA might also be an issue in Lemierre infections. Rarely Lemierre's syndrome is caused by other (usually Gram-negative) bacteria, which include Bacteroides fragilis and Bacteroides melaninogenicus, Peptostreptococcus spp., Streptococcus microaerophile, Staphylococcus aureus, Streptococcus pyogenes, and Eikenella corrodens.

== Pathophysiology ==
Lemierre's syndrome begins with an infection of the head and neck region, with most primary sources of infection in the palatine tonsils and peritonsillar tissue. Usually this infection is a pharyngitis (which occurred in 87.1% of patients as reported by a literature review), and can be preceded by infectious mononucleosis as reported in several cases. It can also be initiated by infections of the ear, mastoid bone, sinuses, or saliva glands.

During the primary infection, F. necrophorum colonizes the infection site and the infection spreads to the parapharyngeal space. The bacteria then invade the peritonsillar blood vessels where they can spread to the internal jugular vein. In this vein, the bacteria cause the formation of a thrombus containing these bacteria. Furthermore, the internal jugular vein becomes inflamed. This septic thrombophlebitis can give rise to septic microemboli that disseminate to other parts of the body where they can form abscesses and septic infarctions. The first capillaries that the emboli encounter where they can nestle themselves are the pulmonary capillaries. As a consequence, the most frequently involved site of septic metastases are the lungs, followed by the joints (knee, hip, sternoclavicular joint, shoulder and elbow). In the lungs, the bacteria cause abscesses, nodulary and cavitary lesions. Pleural effusion is often present. Other sites involved in septic metastasis and abscess formation are the muscles and soft tissues, liver, spleen, kidneys and nervous system (intracranial abscesses, meningitis).

Production of bacterial toxins such as lipopolysaccharide leads to secretion of cytokines by white blood cells which then both lead to symptoms of sepsis. F. necrophorum produces hemagglutinin which causes platelet aggregation that can lead to diffuse intravascular coagulation and thrombocytopenia.

== Diagnosis ==
Diagnosis and the imaging (and laboratory) studies to be ordered largely depend on the patient history, signs and symptoms. If a persistent sore throat with signs of sepsis are found, physicians are cautioned to screen for Lemierre's syndrome.

Laboratory investigations reveal signs of a bacterial infection with elevated C-reactive protein, erythrocyte sedimentation rate and white blood cells (notably neutrophils). Platelet count can be low or high. Liver and kidney function tests are often abnormal.

Thrombosis of the internal jugular vein can be displayed with sonography. Thrombi that have developed recently have low echogenicity or echogenicity similar to the flowing blood, and in such cases pressure with the ultrasound probe show a non-compressible jugular vein - a sure sign of thrombosis. Also color or power Doppler ultrasound identify a low echogenicity blood clot. A CT scan or an MRI scan is more sensitive in displaying the thrombus of the intra-thoracic retrosternal veins, but are rarely needed.

Chest X-ray and chest CT may show pleural effusion, nodules, infiltrates, abscesses and cavitations.

Bacterial cultures taken from the blood, joint aspirates or other sites can identify the causative agent of the disease.

Other illnesses that can be included in the differential diagnosis are:

- Q fever
- Tuberculosis
- Pneumonia

== Treatment ==
Lemierre's syndrome is primarily treated with antibiotics given intravenously. Fusobacterium necrophorum is generally highly susceptible to beta-lactam antibiotics, metronidazole, clindamycin and third generation cephalosporins while the other fusobacteria have varying degrees of resistance to beta-lactams and clindamycin. Additionally, there may exist a co-infection by another bacterium. For these reasons is often advised not to use monotherapy in treating Lemierre's syndrome. Penicillin and penicillin-derived antibiotics can thus be combined with a beta-lactamase inhibitor such as clavulanic acid or with metronidazole.

If antibiotic therapy is unsuccessful, additional treatments include draining of any abscesses and ligation of the internal jugular vein where the antibiotic cannot penetrate. There is no evidence to opt for or against the use of anticoagulation therapy. The low incidence of Lemierre's syndrome has not made it possible to set up clinical trials to study the disease.

== Prognosis ==
The mortality rate was 90% prior to antibiotic therapy. In the contemporary era, a mortality of 4% has been estimated. Since this disease is not well known and often remains undiagnosed, mortality might be much higher. Approximately 10% of those with the condition experience clinical sequelae, including cranial nerve palsy and orthopaedic limitations.

== Epidemiology ==
Lemierre's syndrome is currently rare, but was more common in the early 20th century before the discovery of penicillin. The reduced use of antibiotics for sore throats may have increased the risk of this disease, with 19 cases in 1997 and 34 cases in 1999 reported in the United Kingdom. The estimated incidence rate is 0.8 to 3.6 cases per million in the general population, but is higher in healthy young adults. The number of cases reported is increasing; however, because of its rarity, physicians may be unaware of its existence, possibly leading to underdiagnosis.

== History ==
Sepsis following from a throat infection was described by Hugo Schottmüller in 1918. In 1936, André Lemierre published a series of 20 cases where throat infections were followed by identified anaerobic sepsis, of whom 18 patients died.
