= Cryptobacterium curtum =

Scientific classification
- Domain: Bacteria
- Kingdom: Bacillati
- Phylum: Actinomycetota
- Class: Coriobacteriia
- Order: Eggerthellales
- Family: Eggerthellaceae
- Genus: Cryptobacterium
- Species: C. curtum

Binomial name
- Cryptobacterium curtum Nakazawa et al. 1999

Species of bacterium

Cryptobacterium curtum is a Gram-positive anaerobic rod bacteria isolated from human mouths.

== Description ==
Cryptobacterium curtum is a Gram-positive, obligately anaerobic, non-spore-forming, and rod-shaped bacteria. C. curtum has been isolated from an adult patient's periodontal pocket sample and necrotic dental pulp. C. curtum can also be isolated from human oral and dental infections like pulpal inflammations, advanced caries, dental abscesses or periodontitis. While C. curtum does not appear in the normal microflora, it nearly doubles in population size when periodontitis is present. The cells are very short and can occur singly or in masses. These cells are inert in most biochemical tests. They do not hydrolyze starch or aesculin. They cannot reduce nitrate nor grow in the presence or absence of carbohydrates. C. curtum also had negative results for indole, catalase, and urease tests.

== Genome analysis ==
According to Mavrommatis and colleagues, the genome of C. curtum is 1,617,804 base pairs long. Of the 1422 genes predicted, 1364 were protein-coding genes, and 58 were RNAs. The majority of the genome (78.5%) is made up of protein-coding genes. A 16S rRNA gene sequence analysis revealed that the two isolates represent a distinct lineage within the family of Coriobacteriaceae, between the neighboring genera Eggerthella and Slackia. After sequencing, they found that the DNA G+C content is 50–51 molecular %.

== Metabolic characteristics ==
Cryptobacterium curtum is asaccharolytic and unreactive in many of the conventional biochemical tests. Instead, the arginine deiminase pathway can degrade arginine and other amino acids in oral cavities. This bacterium can degrade arginine and produce substantial amounts of citrulline, ornithine and ammonia. Arginine and citrulline support the growth and reproduction of C. curtum.
