= Olsenella umbonata =

Scientific classification
- Domain: Bacteria
- Kingdom: Bacillati
- Phylum: Actinomycetota
- Class: Coriobacteriia
- Order: Coriobacteriales
- Family: Atopobiaceae
- Genus: Olsenella
- Species: O. umbonata

Binomial name
- Olsenella umbonata Kraatz et al. 2011

Type strain
- CCUG 58604, DSM 22620, JCM 16156, lac31

Synonyms
- Atopobium oviles; Olsenella umbonata Kraatz, Wallace & Svensson 2011

Species of bacterium

Olsenella umbonata is a variably Gram-positive, anaerobic and non-spore-forming bacterium from the genus Olsenella which has been isolated from a sheep rumen and a pig jejunum.
