= Adlercreutzia equolifaciens =

Scientific classification
- Domain: Bacteria
- Kingdom: Bacillati
- Phylum: Actinomycetota
- Class: Coriobacteriia
- Order: Eggerthellales
- Family: Eggerthellaceae
- Genus: Adlercreutzia
- Species: A. equolifaciens

Binomial name
- Adlercreutzia equolifaciens Maruo et al. 2008

Type strain
- FJC-B9

Species of bacterium

Adlercreutzia equolifaciens is a equol-producing bacterium from the genus of Adlercreutzia which has been isolated from human faeces. The species Adlercreutzia equolifaciens has the subspecies Adlercreutzia equolifaciens subsp. celatus and Adlercreutzia equolifaciens subsp. equolifaciens.
