= Denitrobacterium =

Scientific classification
- Domain: Bacteria
- Kingdom: Bacillati
- Phylum: Actinomycetota
- Class: Coriobacteriia
- Order: Eggerthellales
- Family: Eggerthellaceae
- Genus: Denitrobacterium; Anderson et al. 2000
- Species: D. detoxificans

Binomial name
- Denitrobacterium detoxificans Anderson et al. 2000

Genus of bacteria

Denitrobacterium is a genus of Actinomycetota with a single species, in the family Coriobacteriaceae. Originally isolated from the bovine rumen, Denitrobacterium are non-motile and non-spore forming. The only described species in this genus is Denitrobacterium detoxificans. The specific niche of this bacterium in the bovine rumen is theorized to be the detoxification/metabolism of nitrotoxins and miserotoxin.

== Characteristics of Denitrobacterium detoxificans ==
The sole species currently described in the genus Denitrobacterium, D. detoxificans, is a Gram-positive, obligate anaerobe. In the study conducted by Anderson et al., all of the four strains (NPOH1, NPOH2, NPOH3, and MAJ1) are shown to possess high G+C content in their DNAs (60, 58, 56, and 60 mol%, respectively) and are closely related to one another (more than 99% sequence identity). Additionally, the closest intergeneric relative is Coriobacterium glomerans with 86% sequence identity, based on the 16S rRNA sequence comparison between the NPOH1 strain and sequences available in GenBank.

=== Metabolism of nitrocompounds by D. detoxificans ===
In the bovine rumen, Denitrobacterium detoxificans metabolizes the following substrates through oxidation:

- Hydrogen
- Formate
- Lactate

The oxidation of these above compounds are coupled with the reduction of nitrocompounds such as:

- 3-nitro-1-propionic acid (3NPA)
- 3-nitro-1-propanol (3NPOH)
- 2-nitroethane (2NEOH), an analogue of 3NPOH

There are speculations as to how these nitrocompounds are metabolized. The primary mechanism of 3NPA and 3NPOH metabolism is the reduction to amines, i.e. β-alanine and aminopropanol, respectively. β-alanine is further metabolized by ruminal microorganisms, whereas aminopropanol seems to be a final product. It is also speculated that nitrite may be cleaved off from both 3NPA and 3NPOH as a minor metabolite, which is then further reduced to ammonia. 3NPA gets metabolized by ruminal microbes more rapidly than 3NPOH; therefore, 3NPA is less toxic to ruminants grazing on leguminous plants containing the conjugates of these nitrocompounds than 3NPOH.

=== Plants containing the nitrocompounds metabolized by D. detoxificans ===
The above nitrocompounds are abundant in many forages in the forms of glycosides and glucose esters. Miserotoxin is the most common glycoside of 3NPOH as 3-nitro-1-propyl-β-_{D}-glucopyranoside, first isolated from Astragalus oblongifolius. Other glycosides of 3NPOH include β-_{D}-gentiobioside, allolactoside, laminaribioside, and cellobioside from Astragalus miser var. serotinus. Glucose esters of 3NPA are produced by species of the genera Coronilla, Astragalus, Indigofera, and Hiptage. 3NPA is also produced by Astragalus canadensis in the forms of oxotetrahydrofuranyl and isoxazolinone esters.

== History of Denitrobacterium ==
=== Isolation of strains NPOH1-3 and MAJ1 ===
The D. detoxifican strain NPOH1 was first isolated and cultured in the 1996 study by Anderson et al., investigating the metabolism of nitrotoxins such as 3-nitro-1-propanol and 3-nitro-1-propionate. Strains NPOH2 and NPOH3 were isolated from a roll tube containing an agar medium with energy-depleted rumen fluid (at 40% v/v), sodium carbonate, resazurin, _{L}-cysteine-HCl, lipoic acid, vitamins, minerals, and Amisoy (a partially purified soy protein product by Quest International, at 0.08% w/v), supplemented with 9 mM 3-nitro-1-propanol and inoculated with 2 × 10^{−4} mL of nonenriched ruminal fluid. The rumen contents containing NPOH1, NPOH2, and NPOH3 were obtained from two different cows (one with NPOH1 and another with NPOH2&3) at the National Animal Disease Center (NADC) in Ames, IA, USA. Strain MAJ1 was isolated from rumen contents of a cow on a milkvetch range harboring Astragalus miser var. serotinus in British Columbia, Canada.

=== Classification of Denitrobacterium into class Actinobacteria ===
In the 2000 article, Anderson et al. proposed the assignment of the novel bacteria into the class Actinobacteria, subclass Coriobacteridae, order Coriobacteriales, family Coriobacteriaceae based on the high mole percent G+C content and 16S rRNA sequence. The genus Denitrobacterium was included in the family Coriobaceteriaceae by Zhi et al. in the 2009 publication on addendum to the class Actinobacteria.
