= Equol =

Isoflavandiol estrogen metabolized from daidzein

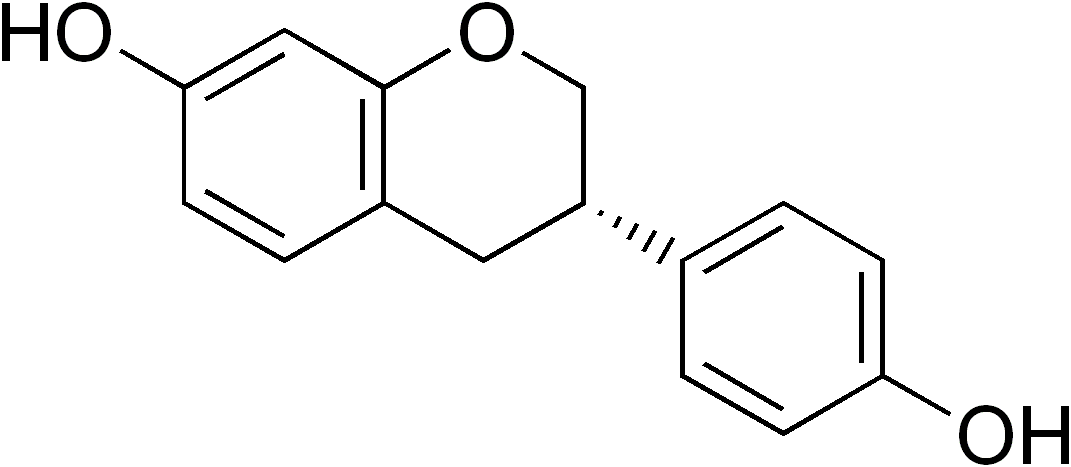

Names
- IUPAC name (3S)-Isoflavan-4,7′-diol
- Systematic IUPAC name (3S)-3-(4-Hydroxyphenyl)-3,4-dihydro-2H-1-benzopyran-7-ol
- Other names 4',7-Isoflavandiol

Identifiers
CAS Number	531-95-3
3D model (JSmol)	Interactive image; Interactive image
ChEMBL	ChEMBL198877
ChemSpider	82594
ECHA InfoCard	100.007.749
KEGG	C14131
PubChem CID	91469
UNII	2T6D2HPX7Q
CompTox Dashboard (EPA)	DTXSID0022309
- InChI: InChI=1S/C15H14O3/c16-13-4-1-10(2-5-13)12-7-11-3-6-14(17)8-15(11)18-9-12/h1-6,8,12,16-17H,7,9H2/t12-/m1/s1 Key: ADFCQWZHKCXPAJ-GFCCVEGCSA-N; InChI=1/C15H14O3/c16-13-4-1-10(2-5-13)12-7-11-3-6-14(17)8-15(11)18-9-12/h1-6,8,12,16-17H,7,9H2/t12-/m1/s1 Key: ADFCQWZHKCXPAJ-GFCCVEGCBP
- SMILES: C1C(COC2=C1C=CC(=C2)O)C3=CC=C(C=C3)O; Oc1ccc(cc1)[C@@H]2Cc3c(OC2)cc(O)cc3

Properties
Chemical formula	C_{15}H_{14}O_{3}
Molar mass	242.274 g·mol^{−1}
- Except where otherwise noted, data are given for materials in their standard state (at 25 °C [77 °F], 100 kPa). verify (what is ?) Infobox references

Equol (4',7-isoflavandiol) is an isoflavandiol estrogen metabolized from daidzein, a type of isoflavone found in soybeans and other plant sources, by bacterial flora in the intestines. While endogenous estrogenic hormones such as estradiol are steroids, equol is a nonsteroidal estrogen. Only about 30–50% of people have intestinal bacteria that make equol.

== History ==
(S)-Equol was first isolated from horse urine in 1932, and the name was suggested by this equine connection. Since then, equol has been found in the urine or plasma of many other animal species, although these animals have significant differences in their ability to metabolize daidzein into equol. In 1980, scientists reported the discovery of equol in humans. The ability of (S)-equol to play a role in the treatment of estrogen- or androgen-mediated diseases or disorders was first proposed in 1984.

== Chemical structure ==
Equol is a compound that can exist in two mirror-image forms known as enantiomers: (S)-equol and (R)-equol. (S)-equol is produced in humans and animals with the ability to metabolize the soy isoflavone daidzein, while (R)-equol can be chemically synthesized. The molecular and physical structure of (S)-equol is similar to that of the hormone estradiol. (S)-Equol preferentially binds estrogen receptor beta.

== Pharmacology ==
=== Estrogen receptor binding ===
(S)-equol is a nonsteroidal, selective agonist of ERβ (K_{i} = 16 nM) with 13-fold selectivity for ERβ over ERα. Relative to (S)-equol, (R)-equol is less potent and binds to ERα (K_{i} = 50 nM) with 3.5-fold selectivity over ERβ. (S)-Equol has about 2% of estradiol's binding affinity for human estrogen receptor alpha (ERα) and 20% of estradiol's binding affinity for human estrogen receptor beta (ERβ). The preferential binding of (S)-equol to ERβ vs. ERα and in comparison to that of estradiol suggests the molecule may share some of the characteristics of a selective estrogen receptor modulator (SERM). Equol has been found to act as an agonist of the GPER (GPR30).

=== Pharmacokinetics ===
(S)-Equol is a very stable molecule that essentially remains unchanged when digested, and this lack of further metabolism explains its very quick absorption and high bioavailability. When (S)-equol is consumed, it is rapidly absorbed and achieves a T_{max} (rate of peak plasma concentration) in two to three hours. In comparison, the T_{max} of daidzein is 4 to 10 hours because daidzein exists in glycoside (with a glucose side chain) form. The body must convert daidzein to its aglycone form (without the glucose side chain) via removal of the sugar side chain during digestion before it can use daidzein. If consumed directly in aglycone form, daidzein has a T_{max} of one to three hours. The percent fractional elimination of (S)-equol in urine after oral administration is high and in some adults can reach close to 100 percent. The percent fractional elimination of daidzein is much lower at 30 to 40 percent.

== Production in humans ==
To produce (S)-equol after soy consumption, humans must have certain strains of bacteria living within their intestines. Twenty-one different strains of intestinal bacteria cultured from humans have been shown to have the ability to transform daidzein into (S)-equol or a related intermediate compound. Several studies indicate that only 25 to 30 percent of the adult populations of Western countries produce (S)-equol after eating soy foods containing isoflavones, while 50 to 60 percent of adults from Japan, Korea, and China are equol-producers. Vegetarians have also been reported to be more capable of transforming daidzein into (S)-equol. Seaweed and dairy consumption can enhance the production of equol. The ability of a person to produce (S)-equol is determined by testing people who have not taken any antibiotics for at least a month. For this standardized test, the individual drinks two 240 milliliter glasses of soy milk or eats a soy food equivalent for three days. The (S)-equol concentration in each test subject's urine is determined on day four.

=== Equol producing bacteria ===
While many more bacteria are involved in the related intermediate process of equol production, such as conversion of daidzin to daidzein, or genistein to 5-Hydroxy-equol, the bacteria that achieve the complete conversion of daidzein to (S)-equol, include:

- Adlercreutzia equolifaciens
- Asaccharobacter celatus AHU1763
- Bacteroides ovatus
- Bifidobacterium
- Bifidobacterium animalis
- Coriobacteriaceae sp MT1B9
- Eggerthella sp YY7918
- Enterococcus faecium
- Eubacterium sp D1 and D2
- Finegoldia magna
- Lactobacillus mucosae
- Lactobacillus sp Niu-O16
- Lactococcus garvieae (Lc 20-92)
- Ruminococcus productus
- Slackia sp HE8
- Slackia equolifaciens (Strain DZE)
- Streptococcus intermedius
- Veillonella sp

Conversion by Bifidobacterium has only been reported once by Tsangalis et al. in 2002 and not reproduced since.Bifidobacteria: Genomics and Molecular Aspects Mixed cultures such as Lactobacillus sp. Niu-O16 and Eggerthella sp. Julong 732 can also produce (S)-equol.Bifidobacteria: Genomics and Molecular Aspects Some equol producing bacteria, as implied by their nomenclature, are Adlercreutzia equolifaciens, Slackia equolifaciens and Slackia isoflavoniconvertens.

== Health effects ==
=== Skin health ===
The topical effects of equol as an anti-aging substance have been shown in different studies. The effects result from both molecular and structural changes to the skin. Equol can, for instance, lead to an increase in telomere length. As an antioxidant, equol can decrease the aging process by reducing damage caused by reactive oxygen species (ROS). It may also act as a protective anti-photoaging substance by inhibiting acute UVA- induced lipid peroxidation. In addition, equol may have a positive impact on epigenetic regulation. Equol's phytoestrogenic properties may also affect skin health. Reduction of dark circles and eye wrinkles after treatment with equol has been reported. Equol may also protect skin from damage by pollution due to its anti-oxidative and anti-inflammatory properties.

Each of the enantiomers and the racemic mixture of both enantiomers have different characteristics, bioavailabilities and molecular effects. According to one study, (RS)-equol provided the greatest overall improvement in skin health, especially when applied topically.

=== Hormone-related health effects ===
Beyond topical effects, medicinal equol has been shown to relieve menopausal symptoms such as hot flashes and muscle and joint pain. (RS)-equol was also reported to reduce symptoms associated with menopausal vaginal atrophy, such as vaginal itching, vaginal dryness and pain with intercourse and cause positive shifts in the vaginal bacterial population, cell composition, and pH.

According to animal studies, it has anti-androgenic effects and may lead to inhibited 5-alpha reductase as well as lowered dihydrotestosterone (DHT) levels.

== See also ==
- Daidzein
- Estrogen receptor
- Genistein
- Liquiritigenin
- Menerba
- Prinaberel
- WAY-200070
- Diarylpropionitrile
