= Olsenella profusa =

Scientific classification
- Domain: Bacteria
- Kingdom: Bacillati
- Phylum: Actinomycetota
- Class: Coriobacteriia
- Order: Coriobacteriales
- Family: Atopobiaceae
- Genus: Olsenella
- Species: O. profusa

Binomial name
- Olsenella profusa Dewhirst et al. 2001

Type strain
- CCUG 45371, CIP 106885, D315A-29, DSM 13989, JCM 14553, KCTC 13917, KCTC 15029

Species of bacterium

Olsenella profusa is a bacterium from the genus Olsenella which has been isolated from subgingival plaque in the United States.
