= Asaccharobacter celatus =

Scientific classification
- Domain: Bacteria
- Kingdom: Bacillati
- Phylum: Actinomycetota
- Class: Coriobacteriia
- Order: Eggerthellales
- Family: Eggerthellaceae
- Genus: Asaccharobacter
- Species: A. celatus

Binomial name
- Asaccharobacter celatus Minamida et al. 2008

Type strain
- AHU 1763, do03, DSM 18785, JCM 14811

Synonyms
- Asaccharobacter equolifaciens celatus (Minamida et al. 2008) Nouioui et al. 2018

Species of bacterium

Asaccharobacter celatus is a Gram-positive, non-spore-forming and obligately anaerobic bacterium from the genus of Asaccharobacter which has been isolated from a rat caecum in Japan. Asaccharobacter celatus produces equol and 5-hydroxy equol.

In 2018, the genus Asaccharobacter was transferred into the genus Adlercreutzia based on branching patterns observed in phylogenetic trees. The correct nomenclature is Adlercreutzia equolifaciens subsp. celatus.

== See also ==
- List of bacteria genera
- List of bacterial orders
