= Drug metabolism =

Biochemical modification of drugs or foreign compounds by living organisms

Drug metabolism within ADME: from administration to clinical response

Drug metabolism is the metabolic breakdown of drugs by humans and animals, usually through specialized enzymatic systems. Drug metabolism represents a more specialized subset of xenobiotic metabolism (from the Greek xenos "stranger" and biotic "related to living beings") which also covers other foreign organic compounds such as pollutants or poisons in wider group of organisms that includes microorganisms, fungi, plants and animals.

These reactions often act to detoxify drugs (although in some cases the intermediates in drug metabolism may cause toxic effects). The study of drug metabolism is one of the tenets of pharmacokinetics (PK) as metabolism (M), the fourth stage of LADME (a drug's transit through the body), involves the enzymatic biotransformation and non-enzymatic biotransformation of a drug, thereby leading to the fifth stage, excretion (E).

The metabolism of pharmaceutical drugs is an important aspect of pharmacology and medicine. For example, the rate of metabolism determines the duration and intensity of a drug's pharmacologic action. Drug metabolism also affects multidrug resistance in infectious diseases and chemotherapy for cancer, and the actions of some drugs as substrates or inhibitors of enzymes involved in xenobiotic metabolism are a common reason for hazardous drug interactions.

== Phases ==
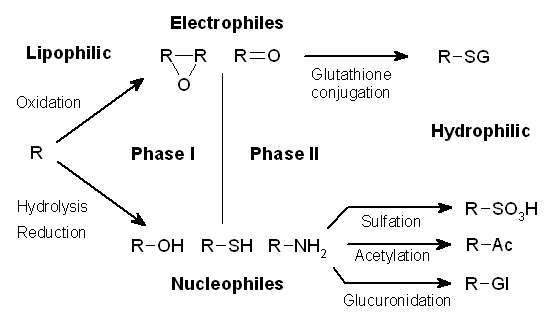
Phases I and II of the metabolism of a lipophilic xenobiotic.

The metabolism of drugs has three distinct phases. Phase I: modification, phase II: conjugation, and phase III: excretion. These phases act sequentially to detoxify drugs and remove them from cells and eventually from the body. The purpose of phase I is to introduce polar groups that either themselves directly facilitate excretion or create reactive functional groups. These reactive groups can be conjugated in a phase II reaction with molecules that are recognized by transport proteins. In phase III, transport proteins eliminate the drug conjugate from the body.

In phase I, enzymes such as Cytochrome P450 oxidases introduce reactive or polar groups into xenobiotics. These modified compounds are then conjugated to polar compounds in phase II reactions. These reactions are catalyzed by transferase enzymes such as glutathione S-transferases. Finally, in phase III, the conjugated xenobiotics may be further processed, before being recognized by efflux transporters and pumped out of cells. Drug metabolism often converts lipophilic compounds into hydrophilic products that are more readily excreted.

== Sites in the body ==
Quantitatively, the smooth endoplasmic reticulum of the liver cell is the principal organ of drug metabolism, although every biological tissue has some ability to metabolize drugs. Factors responsible for the liver's contribution to drug metabolism include that it is a large organ, that it is the first organ perfused by chemicals absorbed in the gut, and that there are very high concentrations of most drug-metabolizing enzyme systems relative to other organs. If a drug is taken into the gastrointestinal tract (GI tract), where it enters the hepatic portal system through the portal vein, it becomes well-metabolized and is said to show the first pass effect.

Other sites of extrahepatic drug metabolism include epithelial cells of the GI tract, lungs, kidneys, and skin. These sites are usually responsible for localized toxicity reactions.

== Modifying factors ==
=== Enzyme induction and inhibition ===
The duration and intensity of pharmacological action of most lipophilic drugs are determined by the rate they are metabolized to inactive products. The Cytochrome P450 monooxygenase system (CYP) is a crucial pathway in this regard. In general, anything that increases the rate of metabolism (e.g., enzyme induction) of a pharmacologically active metabolite will decrease the duration and intensity of the drug action. The opposite is also true, as in enzyme inhibition. However, in cases where an enzyme is responsible for metabolizing a pro-drug into a drug, enzyme induction can accelerate this conversion and increase drug levels, potentially causing toxicity. For example, chemotherapy prodrugs like cyclophosphamide (CPA) and ifosfamide (Ifex), which are initially inactive, become toxic as they are metabolized into cytotoxic compounds (such as phosphoramide mustard and chloroacetaldehyde) primarily from liver enzymes CYP2B6 and CYP3A4. Co-administration of a strong CYP inducer, such as phenytoin or rifampicin, accelerates metabolism and increases the rate of bioactivation which causes a higher concentration of cytotoxic metabolites that may lead to higher toxicity. This drug–drug interaction may enhance the risk of adverse effects, most notably severe myelosuppression and hemorrhagic cystitis.

== Clinical significance ==
=== Drug-drug interactions ===
Typically, drug-drug interactions are formally quantified by comparing the observed combined effect of two co-administered drugs against a theoretical baseline of no interaction. This concept, commonly referred to as the additive effect, explains the synergistic interaction, or lack thereof, between drugs. In order to validly quantify the effect, two primary null models are used: loewe additivity and bliss independence. Loewe additivity (dosage additivity) postulates that if two drugs share the same mechanism of action, their combined effects should be identical to the effect achieved from taking a higher dose of either drug alone. Bliss independence (response additivity) postulates that if two drugs act independently of each other, their combined effect should be the product of their individual effects. Both models identify two combined effects that signal a true drug interaction, as they deviate from the additive baseline: a synergistic effect, where the observed combined effect is greater than predicted which results in higher efficacy or toxicity levels; and an antagonistic effect, where the observed combined effect is less than predicted which often results in drug therapy problems.

The therapeutic index (TI) of a drug is the measurement of its efficacy, calculated as the ratio of the median toxic dose (TD_{50}) to the median effective dose (ED_{50}). Various Cytochrome P450 metabolic enzymes are inhibited or induced by many drugs. For example, chronic alcohol consumption will induce Cytochrome P450 enzymes, like CYP2E1, which enhances the metabolism of ethanol. As a consequence, the induction of CYP2E1 will increase a person's tolerance levels and reduce the toxicity of ethanol. Additionally, CYP2E1 is involved with the metabolism of acetaldehyde (CH₃CHO), a metabolite of alcohol that is highly reactive and toxic, which can contribute to an alcohol-induced liver injury along with overoxidation.

Various physiological and pathological factors can also affect drug metabolism. Physiological factors that can influence drug metabolism include age, individual variation (e.g., pharmacogenetics), enterohepatic circulation, nutrition, sex differences or gut microbiota. This last factor has significance because gut microorganisms are able to chemically modify the structure of drugs through degradation and biotransformation processes, thus altering the activity and toxicity of drugs. These processes can decrease the efficacy of drugs, as is the case of digoxin in the presence of Eggerthella lenta (E. lenta) in the microbiota. Genetic variation, also known as polymorphism, accounts for some of the variability in the effect of drugs. An example of polymorphism affecting drug metabolism is the alcohol flush reaction caused by the ALDH2 genetic mutation. The ALDH2 genetic mutation is prevalent among east Asians and causes a reduced activity of aldehyde dehydrogenase (ALDH), which assists in breaking down acetaldehyde (CH₃CHO). As of 2019, approximately 560 million people (8% of the world's population in 2019) had this genetic mutation, which posed various health risks like metabolic disorders or an increased cancer risk.

=== Age ===
In general, drugs are metabolized more slowly in fetal, neonatal and elderly humans and animals than in adults. Inherited genetic variations in drug-metabolizing enzymes result in different catalytic activity levels. For example, N-acetyltransferases (involved in Phase II reactions), individual variation creates a group of people who acetylate slowly (slow acetylators) and those who acetylate quickly (rapid acetylators), split roughly 50:50 in the population of Canada. However, variability in NAT2 alleles distribution across different populations is high, and some ethnicities have a higher proportion of slow acetylators. This variation in metabolizing capacity may have dramatic consequences, as the slow acetylators are more prone to dose-dependent toxicity. NAT2 enzyme is a primary metabolizer of antituberculosis (isoniazid), some antihypertensive (hydralazine), anti-arrhythmic drugs (procainamide), antidepressants (phenelzine) and many more. Additionally, an increased toxicity in drug adverse reactions in slow acetylators have been widely reported. Similar phenomena of altered metabolism due to inherited variations have been described for other drug-metabolizing enzymes, like CYP2D6, CYP3A4, DPYD, UGT1A1. DPYD and UGT1A1 genotyping is now required before administration of the corresponding substrate compounds (5-FU and capecitabine for DPYD and irinotecan for UGT1A1) to determine the activity of DPYD and UGT1A1 enzyme and reduce the dose of the drug in order to avoid severe adverse reactions.

Dose, frequency, route of administration, tissue distribution, and protein binding of the drug affect its metabolism (M).

=== Disease ===
Pathological factors can also influence drug metabolism, including liver, kidney, or heart disease.

In silico modelling and simulation methods allow drug metabolism to be predicted in virtual patient populations prior to performing clinical studies in human subjects. This can be used to identify individuals most at risk from adverse reaction.

== History ==
Studies on how people transform the substances that they ingest began in the mid-nineteenth century, with chemists discovering that organic chemicals such as benzaldehyde could be oxidized and conjugated to amino acids in the human body. During the remainder of the nineteenth century, several other basic detoxification reactions were discovered, such as methylation, acetylation, and sulfonation.

In the early twentieth century, work moved on to the investigation of the enzymes and pathways that were responsible for the production of these metabolites. This field became defined as a separate area of study with the publication by Richard Williams of the book Detoxication mechanisms in 1947. This modern biochemical research resulted in the identification of glutathione S-transferases in 1961, followed by the discovery of cytochrome P450s in 1962, and the realization of their central role in xenobiotic metabolism in 1963.
