= Tractidigestivibacter scatoligenes =

Scientific classification
- Domain: Bacteria
- Kingdom: Bacillati
- Phylum: Actinomycetota
- Class: Coriobacteriia
- Order: Coriobacteriales
- Family: Atopobiaceae
- Genus: Tractidigestivibacter
- Species: T. scatoligenes

Binomial name
- Tractidigestivibacter scatoligenes (Li et al. 2015) Zgheib et al. 2021

Type strain
- SK9K4 (= DSM 28304 = JCM 19907)

Synonyms
- Olsenella scatoligenes Li et al. 2015

Species of bacterium

Tractidigestivibacter scatoligenes is a Gram-positive, saccharolytic, non-spore-forming, strictly anaerobic, and non-motile bacterium in the family Atopobiaceae. It was originally isolated from pig feces in Denmark and is the type species of the genus Tractidigestivibacter.

== Taxonomy ==
The species was originally described in 2015 as Olsenella scatoligenes. A phylogenomic revision of the family Atopobiaceae in 2021 transferred it to the newly established genus Tractidigestivibacter, resulting in the combination Tractidigestivibacter scatoligenes. The List of Prokaryotic names with Standing in Nomenclature recognizes this as the correct name and treats Olsenella scatoligenes as a homotypic synonym.

The specific epithet scatoligenes means “skatole-producing”, referring to the bacterium's production of skatole.

== Characteristics ==
Cells are Gram-positive, strictly anaerobic, non-motile, non-spore-forming coccobacilli. The species metabolizes indole-3-acetic acid to 3-methylindole (skatole) and produces 4-methylphenol (p-cresol) from p-hydroxyphenylacetic acid. Skatole is an important contributor to boar taint, an undesirable odour and flavour that can occur in pork from uncastrated male pigs.
