= Slackia faecicanis =

Scientific classification
- Domain: Bacteria
- Kingdom: Bacillati
- Phylum: Actinomycetota
- Class: Coriobacteriia
- Order: Eggerthellales
- Family: Eggerthellaceae
- Genus: Slackia
- Species: S. faecicanis

Binomial name
- Slackia faecicanis Lawson et al. 2005

Type strain
- CCUG 48399, CIP 108281, JCM 14555, 5WC12

Species of bacterium

Slackia faecicanis is a Gram-positive, non-spore-forming and rod-shaped bacterium from the genus Slackia which has been isolated from faeces of a dog from England.
