= Adlercreutzia rubneri =

Scientific classification
- Domain: Bacteria
- Kingdom: Bacillati
- Phylum: Actinomycetota
- Class: Coriobacteriia
- Order: Eggerthellales
- Family: Eggerthellaceae
- Genus: Adlercreutzia
- Species: A. rubneri

Binomial name
- Adlercreutzia rubneri Stoll et al. 2021

Type strain
- ResAG-91

Species of bacterium

Adlercreutzia rubneri is an anaerobic, Gram-positive and Rod-shaped bacterium from the genus of Adlercreutzia which has been isolated from human faeces. Adlercreutzia rubneri is capable to metabolize resveratrol.
