= Parvibacter =

Scientific classification
- Domain: Bacteria
- Kingdom: Bacillati
- Phylum: Actinomycetota
- Class: Coriobacteriia
- Order: Eggerthellales
- Family: Eggerthellaceae
- Genus: Parvibacter; Clavel et al. 2013
- Species: P. caecicola

Binomial name
- Parvibacter caecicola Clavel et al. 2013

Genus of bacteria

Parvibacter is a genus in the phylum Actinomycetota containing a single species, Parvibacter caecicola.

== Taxonomy ==
In 2018, Nouioui et al. proposed merging the genus Parvibacter along with the genera Asaccharobacter and Enterorhabdus within the genus Aldercreutzia based on observed clustering of these genera within phylogenetic trees. However, subsequent phylogenetic analyses observed that Parvibacter caecicola exhibited much deeper branching compared to other Aldercreutzia species. Its phylogenetic distinctness was further demonstrated by the presence of five conserved signature indels (CSIs) that are exclusively shared by all Aldercreutzia species except for P. caecicola. Thus, P. caecicola was transferred back into the genus Parvibacter, which continues to be a validly published genus.
