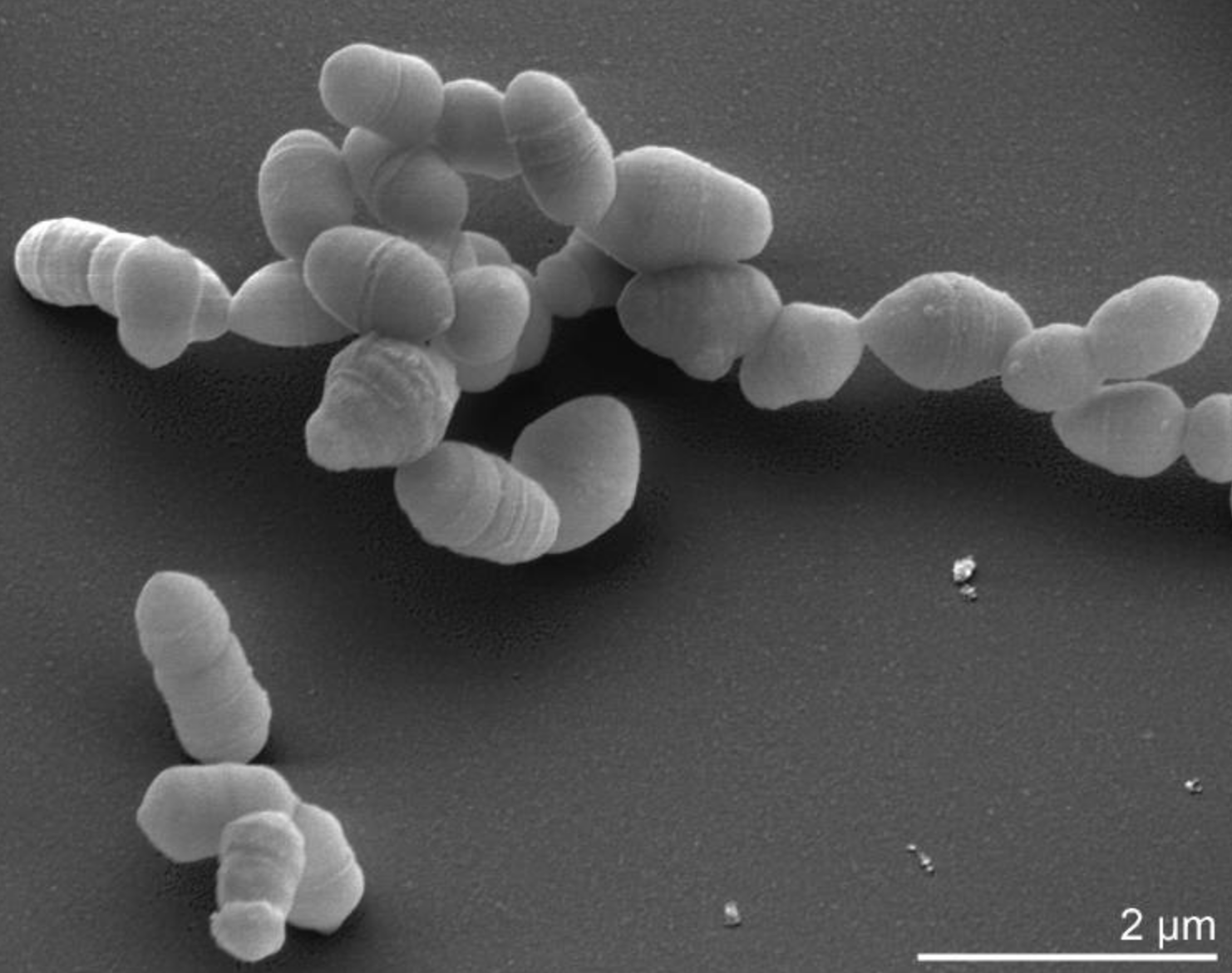
- Microscopic image of Atopobium parvulum

Scientific classification
- Domain: Bacteria
- Kingdom: Bacillati
- Phylum: Actinomycetota
- Class: Coriobacteriia
- Order: Coriobacteriales
- Family: Atopobiaceae
- Genus: Atopobium; Collins and Wallbanks 1993

Type species
- Atopobium minutum (Hauduroy et al. 1937) Collins & Wallbanks 1993

Species
- A. deltae; "A. detroiti"; A. fossor; "A. massiliense"; A. minutum

= Atopobium =

Genus of bacteria

Atopobium is a genus of Actinomycetota, in the family Coriobacteriaceae. Atopobium species are anaerobic, Gram-positive rod-shaped or elliptical bacteria found as single elements or in pairs or short chains.

Atopobium vaginae was discovered in 1999. This is a facultative anaerobic bacteria, which form small colonies on blood agar at 37 °C is also positive for acid phosphatase. This species has now been reclassified into the genus Fannyhessea following phylogenetic studies.

== Clinical significance ==
The genus Atopobium may be associated with bacterial vaginosis.

The genus may play a role in the development of Colorectal cancer. While the genus has been reported as overrepresented in feces of patients, A. minutum has conversely shown a mild apoptotic effect on cancer cells in vitro and has been suggested to be comparable to probiotic bacteria in regards to colorectal cancer.

== Phylogeny ==
The currently accepted taxonomy is based on the List of Prokaryotic names with Standing in Nomenclature (LPSN) and National Center for Biotechnology Information (NCBI).

16S rRNA based LTP_10_2024

- Atopobium
  - A. deltae Cools et al. 2014
  - - A. fossor (Bailey and Love 1986) Kageyama et al. 1999
    - A. minutum (Hauduroy et al. 1937) Collins and Wallbanks 1993

120 marker proteins based GTDB 10-RS226

- Atopobium
  - A. deltae
  - - A. fossor
    - A. minutum

== See also ==
- List of bacterial vaginosis microbiota
