= Adlercreutzia hattorii =

Scientific classification
- Domain: Bacteria
- Kingdom: Bacillati
- Phylum: Actinomycetota
- Class: Coriobacteriia
- Order: Eggerthellales
- Family: Eggerthellaceae
- Genus: Adlercreutzia
- Species: A. hattorii

Binomial name
- Adlercreutzia hattorii Sakamoto et al. 2021

Type strain
- 8CFCBH1

Species of bacterium

Adlercreutzia hattorii is a Gram-positive, obligately anaerobic and Rod-shaped bacterium from the genus of Adlercreutzia which has been isolated from human faeces.
