= Slackia piriformis =

Scientific classification
- Domain: Bacteria
- Kingdom: Bacillati
- Phylum: Actinomycetota
- Class: Coriobacteriia
- Order: Eggerthellales
- Family: Eggerthellaceae
- Genus: Slackia
- Species: S. piriformis

Binomial name
- Slackia piriformis Nagai et al. 2010

Type strain
- DSM 22477, JCM 16070, YIT 12062

Species of bacterium

Slackia piriformis is a Gram-positive, strictly anaerobic, non-spore-forming and rod-shaped bacterium from the genus Slackia which has been isolated from human faeces from Tokyo in Japan.
