= Olsenella uli =

Scientific classification
- Domain: Bacteria
- Kingdom: Bacillati
- Phylum: Actinomycetota
- Class: Coriobacteriia
- Order: Coriobacteriales
- Family: Atopobiaceae
- Genus: Olsenella
- Species: O. uli

Binomial name
- Olsenella uli (Olsen et al. 1991) Dewhirst et al. 2001

Type strain
- ATCC 49627, CCUG 31166, CIP 109912, DSM 7084, JCM 12494, KCTC 5039, LMG 11480, NCFB 2895, NCIMB 702895, VPI D76D-27C

Synonyms
- Atopobium uli Lactobacillus uli

Species of bacterium

Olsenella uli is a Gram-positive bacterium from the genus Olsenella which has been isolated from the gingival crevice of humans. Olsenella uli can cause endodontic infections.
