= Indoleacetate decarboxylase =

Identifiers
- EC no.: 4.1.1.115

Databases
- BRENDA: enzyme data
- ExPASy: NiceZyme view
- KEGG: enzyme entry
- MetaCyc: metabolic pathway
- Rhea: reactions
- PDB structures: RCSB PDB PDBe PDBsum
Search
- PMC: articles
- PubMed: articles
- NCBI: proteins

Indoleacetate decarboxylase (IAD) is a glycyl radical enzyme (therefore member of the GRE superfamily) that catalyses the decarboxylation of indoleacetate to form skatole, which is a malodorous organic compound that gives animal faeces their characteristic smell. This decarboxylation is the last step of the tryptophan fermentation in some types of anaerobic bacteria.

Tryptophan (Trp), Tyrosine (Tyr) and Phenylalanine (Phe) are aromatic aminoacids that can be degraded by certain types of fermenting bacteria. These bacteria create indoleacetate, p-hydroxyphenylacetate and phenylacetate, respectively. In addition, some bacteria carry out a further step, decarboxylating these compounds and creating skatole, cresol and toluene, respectively, which are volatile aromatic compounds. Out of these three compounds, skatole is the most noticeable as its distinct faecal malodour is detectable at the lowest concentration of 0.00056 parts per million (0.0030 mg/m^{3}).

== Discovery ==
The study that led to the discovery of the indoleacetate decarboxylase enzyme was published in 2018., and was carried out by an international research team, co-led by Huimin Zhao, from the A*STAR Institute of Chemical and Engineering Sciences.

The researchers compared the genoma of two skatole producers bacteria, Clostridium scatologenes (Cs) and Olsenella scatoligenes (Os), isolated from acidic sediment and swine manure respectively, in order to identify a candidate GRE with IAD activity. The team found two proteins that share approximately half of the sequence identity, suggesting they might have the same function as well: A0A0E3M8P3 in Cs (CsIAD) and A0A100YXA1 in Os (OsIAD). To confirm their biochemical activity, the researchers recombinantly produced the enzyme OsIAD and its protein neighborhood, in which it was its activating enzyme, OsIADAE. Once the enzyme was conveniently activated, it was incubated with indoleacetate, and this process resulted in the generation of skatole, proving that OsAID was an IAD. This enzyme was also incubated with phenylacetate and p-hydroxyphenylacetate and there was no activity, indicating high substrate specificity.

== Structure ==
The structure of the IAD hasn't been discovered yet, but as a glycyl radical enzyme (GRE) it is known that its core structure is formed by a 10-stranded β-barrel surrounded by α-helices.

== Reaction mechanism ==
Tryptophan is first converted into indoleacetate (indole-3-acetate) and then to skatole by IAD.

Indoleacetate decarboxylase takes part in the tryptophan fermentation, which involves two steps. The first one consists of the degradation of the amino acid into indole-3-acetate. And in the second step, IAD catalyzes the decarboxylation of the indole-3-acetate to form the final product, skatole.

The decarboxylation of indole-3-acetate is chemically difficult since it leaves an unstable carbanion because of the direct elimination of CO_{2}. This chemical reaction is promoted by 1-electron oxidation of indole-3-acetate through a proton-coupled electron transfer (PCET), which requires the transfer of the indolic-NH proton to a suitably positioned base, producing an indoleacetate anion radical intermediate.

== Biological relevance ==
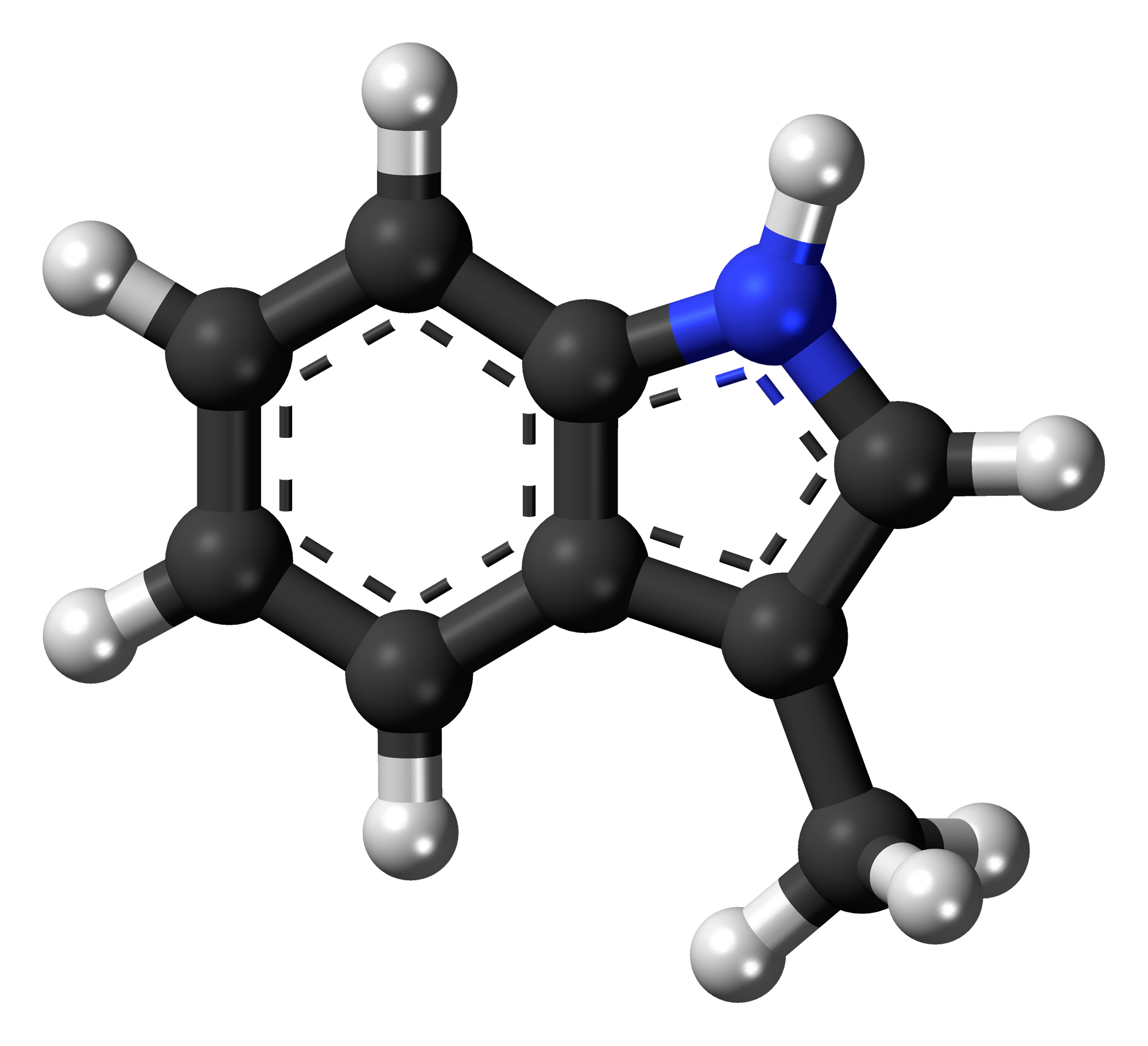
Three-dimensional structure of a skatole molecule, a tryptophan fermentation product.

The discovery of IAD provides a way to identify the skatole-producing bacteria and helps us understand the fermentation pathways and their products, which had not been found in previous studies.

Fermentation of aromatic amino acids (in this case tryptophan) leads to a large variety of products that remain with their stable aromatic rings. When this fermentation takes place in the human or animal gut, these compounds can accumulate in the host bloodstream and have global physiological or pathological effects.

Several analysis in humans showed the presence of IAD in two more bacteria: Olsenella uli from the gingival crevice, and Faecalicatena contorta from gangrenous appendicitis. This enzyme also contributes to halitosis, since it is present in certain sequenced human oral bacteria, and this discovery could open some doors to treat this condition. Furthermore, the mosquitoes that cause Japanese encephalitis and West Nile virus are known to be attracted by skatole, so blocking the production of this molecule might help to combat the spread of this infections

In the farming industry, skatole is a major component of the manure smell and the source of some bovine respiratory diseases. Skatole causes acute bovine pulmonary edema (ABPD, a condition caused by excess fluid in the lungs) and emphysema (condition that causes shortness of breath) in cattle. It is also responsible for the intense offensive odor and taste that can be evident when cooking or eating pork. Many ruminants are susceptible to ABPE, a disease in which skatole acts as a very selective pneumotoxin that causes the degeneration of certain lung tissues. Therefore, by knowing the IAD mechanism, the skatole products could be suppressed and with them the unpleasant smell of animal feaces and the other pathological effects that has on many living creatures.
