= Asaccharobacter =

Scientific classification
- Domain: Bacteria
- Kingdom: Bacillati
- Phylum: Actinomycetota
- Class: Coriobacteriia
- Order: Eggerthellales
- Family: Eggerthellaceae
- Genus: Asaccharobacter; Minamida et al. 2008

Type species
- Asaccharobacter celatus Minamida et al. 2008

Species
- A . celatus

Genus of bacteria

Asaccharobacter is a bacterial genus from the family of Coriobacteriaceae. Up to now there is only one species of this genus known (Asaccharobacter celatus).

In 2018, Nouioui et al. proposed merging the genus Asaccharobacter within the genus Aldercreutzia based on observed clustering of these genera within phylogenetic trees. The correct nomenclature for the sole species of this genus is now Adlercreutzia equolifaciens subsp. celatus.

== See also ==
- List of bacteria genera
- List of bacterial orders
