= DZE =

DZE or dze may refer to:

- Dze, letter of the Cyrillic script
- Dze (Pashto), Pashto letter representing the sibilant affricative sound
- -dze, "son" suffix in Georgian surnames
- DZE, production company for Scary Movie
- DZE, type strain for slackia equolifaciens
- dze, ISO 639-3 code for Jiwarli dialect
