= Fannyhessea =

Scientific classification
- Domain: Bacteria
- Kingdom: Bacillati
- Phylum: Actinomycetota
- Class: Coriobacteriia
- Order: Coriobacteriales
- Family: Atopobiaceae
- Genus: Fannyhessea; Nouioui et al. 2018
- Species: F. vaginae

Binomial name
- Fannyhessea vaginae (Rodriguez Jovita et al. 1999) Nouioui et al. 2018

Synonyms
- Atopobium vaginae Rodriguez Jovita et al. 1999

Species of bacterium

Fannyhessea vaginae is a species of bacteria in the family Atopobiaceae, and the only species in the genus Fannyhessea. It is a facultative anaerobic, Gram-positive rod-shaped or elliptical coccobacillus found as single elements or in pairs or short chains. It is typically isolated from 80% of women with bacterial vaginosis and it is implicated in treatment failures. Invasive infections such as bacteremia have been reported.
