= Phosphoribosyl 1,2-cyclic phosphate 1,2-diphosphodiesterase =

Class of enzymes

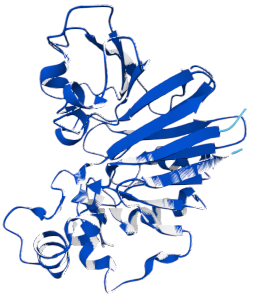
- The enzyme as folded by AlphaFold

Identifiers
- EC no.: 3.1.4.57

Databases
- BRENDA: enzyme data
- ExPASy: NiceZyme view
- KEGG: enzyme entry
- MetaCyc: metabolic pathway
- Rhea: reactions
- PDB structures: RCSB PDB PDBe PDBsum
Search
- PMC: articles
- PubMed: articles
- NCBI: proteins

Phosphoribosyl 1,2-cyclic phosphate 1,2-diphosphodiesterase, known also as cyclic phosphate dihydrolase is a hydrolase enzyme found in various species of bacteria. It uses water to catalyze the hydrolysis of 5-phospho-α-D-ribose cyclic-1,2-phosphate to form D-ribofuranose-5-phosphate via D-ribofuranose-2,5-bisphosphate.

5-phospho-α-D-ribose cyclic-1,2-phosphate
H_{2}O
D-ribofuranose-2,5-bisphosphate
H_{2}O
P_{i}
D-ribofuranose-5-phosphate

In Eggerthella lenta, Gordonibacter urolithinfaciens and Gordonibacter pamelaeae, the enzyme is encoded by the gene phnPP. The protein consists of 252 amino acids. The enzyme is known to have metal-ion binding sites for Mn^{2+} and Zn^{2+}. The enzyme is involved in the catabolism of organophosphonates.
