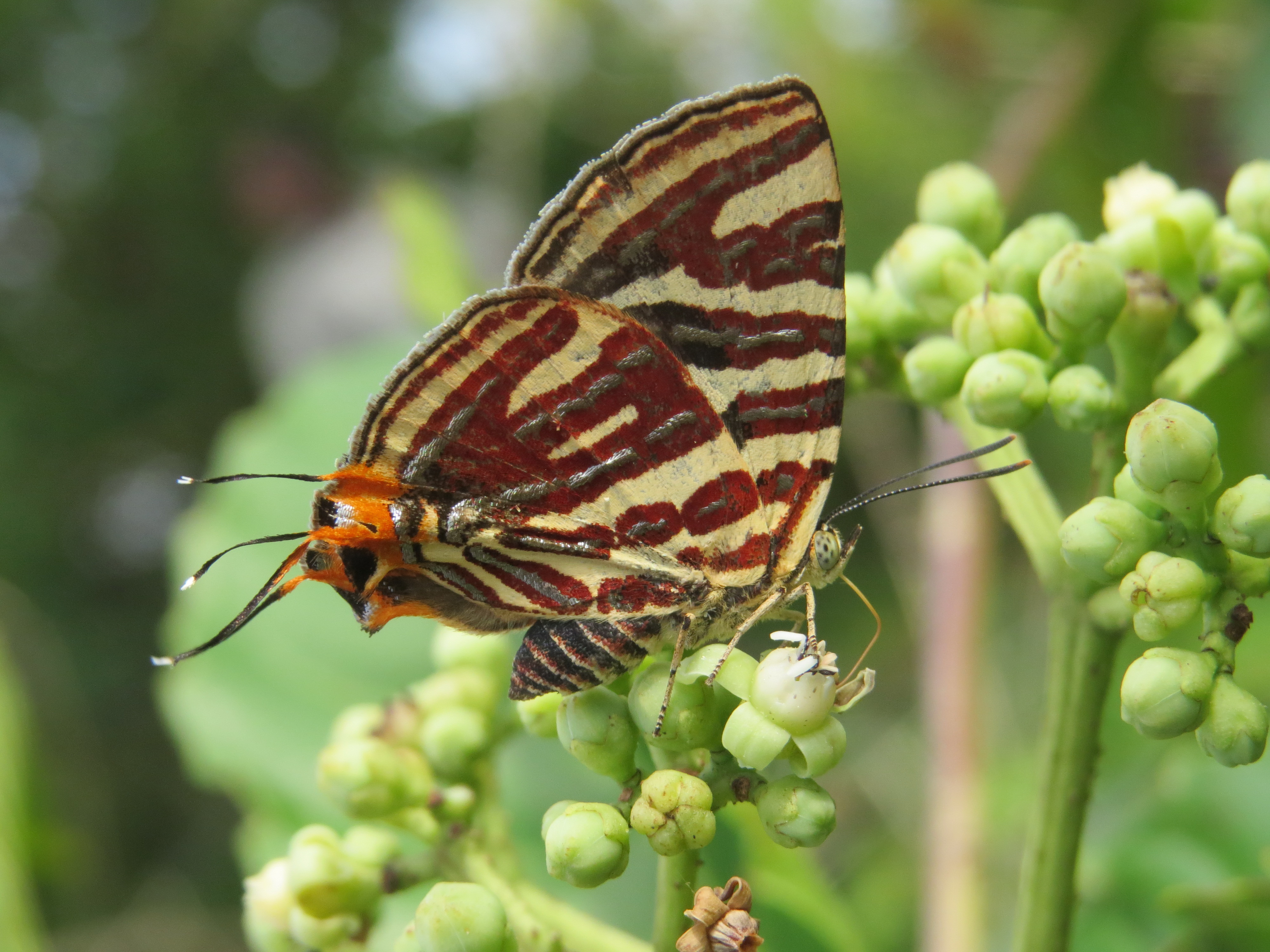

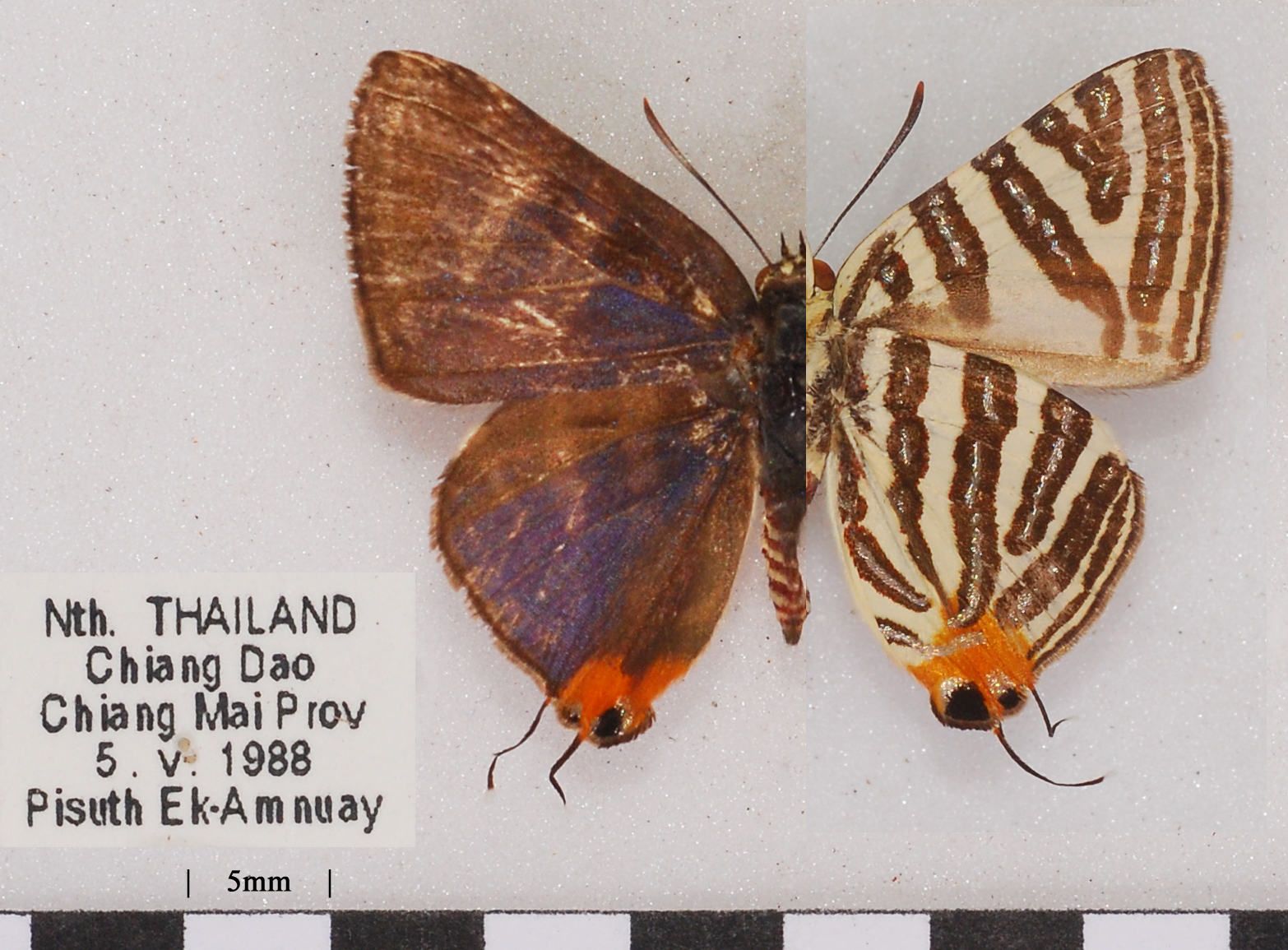
- Cigaritis lohita senama (Fruhstorfer, 1912)

Scientific classification
- Kingdom: Animalia
- Phylum: Arthropoda
- Class: Insecta
- Order: Lepidoptera
- Family: Lycaenidae
- Genus: Cigaritis
- Species: C. lohita

Binomial name
- Cigaritis lohita (Horsfield, 1829)

Synonyms
- Amblypodia lohita Horsfield, 1829; Spindasis lohita (Horsfield); Cigaritis lohita (Horsfield); Aphnaeus lazularia Moore, [1881]; Aphnaeus himalayanus Moore, 1884; Aphnaeus lohita senama Fruhstorfer, 1912; Aphnaeus zebrinus Moore, 1884; Spindasis milleri Corbet, 1940; Aphnaeus lohita batina Fruhstorfer, 1912; Aphnaeus lohita panasa Fruhstorfer, 1912; Aphnaeus formosanus Moore, 1877

= Cigaritis lohita =

Long-banded silverline

Species of butterfly

Cigaritis lohita, the long-banded silverline, is a species of lycaenid or blue butterfly.

== Description ==
Male. Upperside blackish-brown tinted with violet-blue. Forewing sometimes with some of the bands of the underside visible through the wing, the violet-blue with some gloss in certain lights merging into the black costal and outer marginal borders. Hindwing with the blue colour more distinct and somewhat more glossy, covering the whole surface of the wing except the costal space and the abdominal fold which are broadly pale blackish-brown, outer marginal line black, a fairly large anal orange patch, a black spot in the anal lobe, a small one between the tails, each with some silvery scales; tails black, tipped with white. Cilia of both wings grey. Underside yellowish-white, bands very dark red, with more or less disconnected silvery lines inside them. Forewing with a sub-basal bar from the costa connected with a short streak from the base, another from the costa across the middle of the cell, both with some suffused blackish below them, an outwardly oblique bar from the costa across the end of the cell to the sub-median vein, with a small blackish narrow and inwardly bent short bar in continuation, two short bars from the costa meeting hindwards, and a sub-marginal even band which ends close to the end of the oblique band in a similar manner, a marginal even band, these two bands so close together as to leave but a thin line of the ground colour between them, marginal line black, with an inner fine pale thread. Hindwing with the marginal bands and lines as in the forewing, and four bands at fairly equal distances apart, all rather broad, leaving but narrow spaces of the ground colour between them; the first is basal, continued hindwards in the form of a curved streak close along the abdominal margin, the other three are ante-medial, medial, and post-medial, all arising from the costa, the two inner ones touching the end of the basal streak and the ends of each other on the upperside of the anal orange spot, the post-medial band narrows gradually hindwards and touches the medial band at vein 2; the anal orange patch is about the size it is on the upperside, and contains two similar black spots and silvery scales. Antennae black, with white dots at the sides, club with a red tip; frons black, with a white stripe on each side; head and body above and below concolorous with the wings, legs greyish white, without markings. Female, like the male above and below, the violet-blue tint on the upperside somewhat paler and duller, the colour of the wings in some examples more brown.

— Charles Swinhoe, Lepidoptera Indica. Vol. IX

The wingspan of Cigaritis lohita reaches 27–32 millimetres (1.1–1.3 in).

== Subspecies ==
- Cigaritis lohita lohita (Horsfield, 1829) - Java
- Cigaritis lohita lazularia (Moore, 1881) - Sri Lanka, South India
- Cigaritis lohita himalayanus (Moore, 1884) - India, Nepal, Bhutan, Assam, Sikkim to Burma, northern Thailand
- Cigaritis lohita senama (Fruhstorfer, 1912) - Sumatra, Peninsular Malaya, Singapore, Langkawi, southern Thailand
  - Cigaritis lohita senama f. zebrinus Moore, 1884 - Sri Lanka
- Cigaritis lohita batina (Fruhstorfer, 1912) - southern Vietnam, China: southern Yunnan
- Cigaritis lohita panasa (Fruhstorfer, 1912) - northern Vietnam
- Cigaritis lohita formosana (Moore, 1877) - Taiwan

== Host plants ==
This species has been recorded on: Coffea liberica (Rubiaceae), Dioscorea species (Dioscoreaceae) Glochidion rubrum (Euphorbiaceae), Hiptage benghalensis (Malpighiaceae), Litchi species (Sapindaceae), Xylia species and Peltophorum species (Leguminosae) as well as on Psidium guajava (Myrtaceae).

== Distribution ==
This species can be found in China, India, Bangladesh, Nepal, Bhutan, Myanmar, Thailand, Sumatra, Java, Peninsular Malaya and Vietnam.

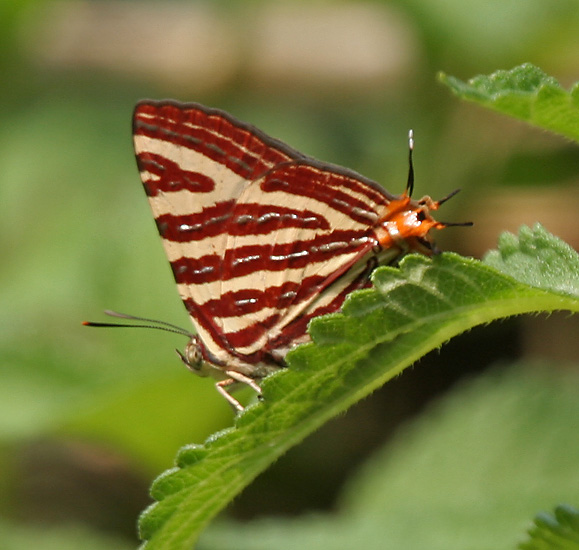
In Buxa Tiger Reserve, India

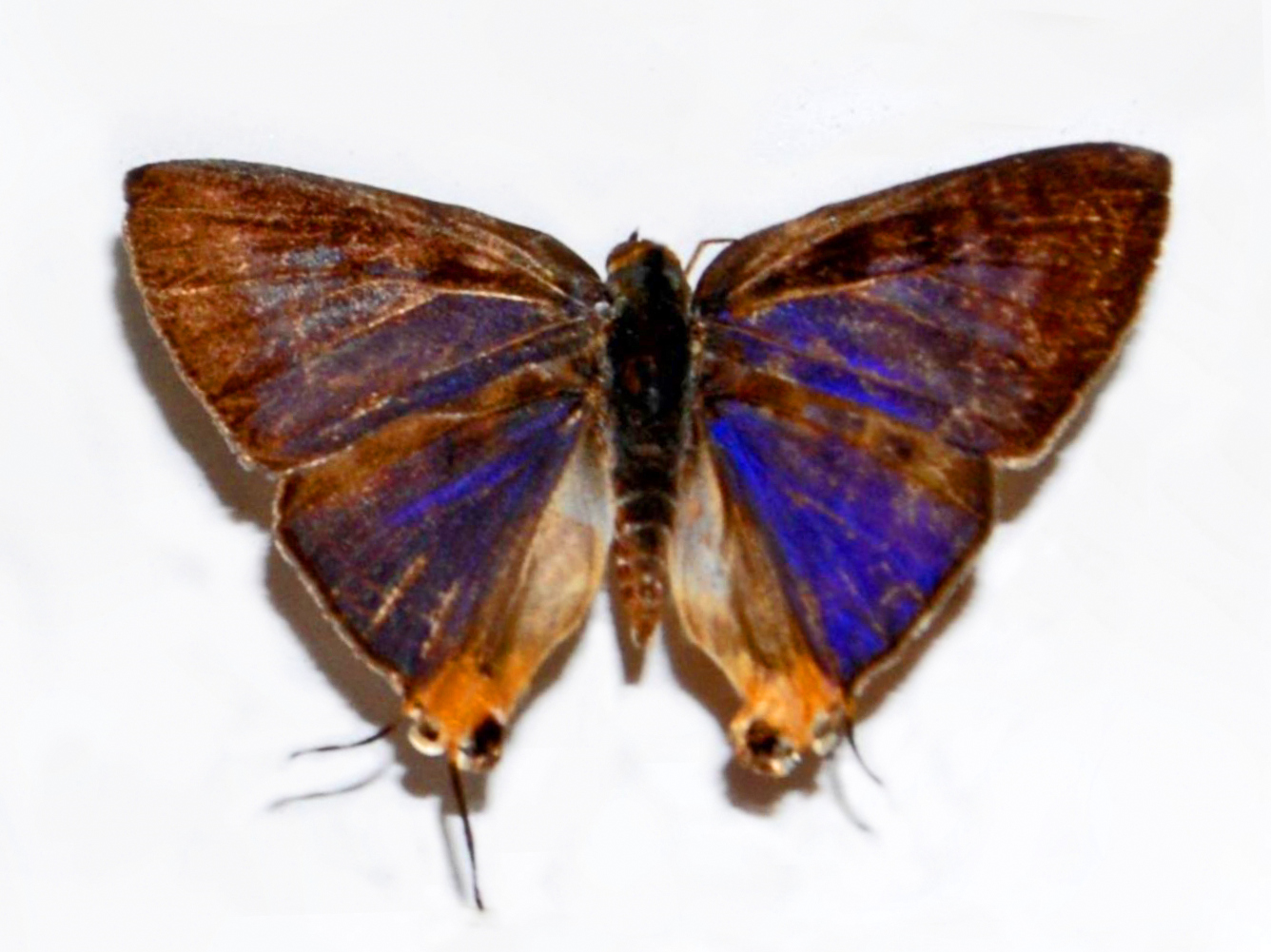
C. l. himalayanus upperside
