= Slackia equolifaciens =

Scientific classification
- Domain: Bacteria
- Kingdom: Bacillati
- Phylum: Actinomycetota
- Class: Coriobacteriia
- Order: Eggerthellales
- Family: Eggerthellaceae
- Genus: Slackia
- Species: S. equolifaciens

Binomial name
- Slackia equolifaciens Jin et al. 2010

Type strain
- CCUG 58231, JCM 16059, DZE

Species of bacterium

Slackia equolifaciens is an equol-producing bacterium from the genus Slackia which has been isolated from human faeces from Japan.
