= Slackia isoflavoniconvertens =

Scientific classification
- Domain: Bacteria
- Kingdom: Bacillati
- Phylum: Actinomycetota
- Class: Coriobacteriia
- Order: Eggerthellales
- Family: Eggerthellaceae
- Genus: Slackia
- Species: S. isoflavoniconvertens

Binomial name
- Slackia isoflavoniconvertens Matthies et al 2009

Type strain
- CCUG 57679, DSM 22006, HE8, JCM 16137

Species of bacterium

Slackia isoflavoniconvertens is a bacterium from the genus Slackia which has been isolated from faeces of a human from Nuthetal in Germany. Slackia isoflavoniconvertens can metabolize daidzein and genistein, two compounds in the class of isoflavones.
