= Additive effect =

Concept in pharmacology and biochemistry

Additive effect in pharmacology describes the situation when the combining effects of two drugs equal the sum of the effects of the two drugs acting independently. The concept of additive effect is derived from the concept of synergy. It was introduced by the scientists in pharmacology and biochemistry fields in the process of understanding the synergistic interaction between drugs and chemicals over the century.

Additive effect often occurs when two similar drugs are taken together to achieve the same degree of therapeutic effect while reducing the specific adverse effect of one particular drug. For example, aspirin, paracetamol, and caffeine are formulated together to treat pain caused by tension headaches and migraine.

Additive effect can be used to detect synergy as it can be considered as the baseline effect in methods determining whether drugs have synergistic effect. Synergistic effect is similar to additive effect, having a combination effect greater than additive effect. It can produce an effect of 2+2 > 4 when two drugs are used together. Additive effect can also be found in a majority of combination therapies, although synergistic effect is more common. If the combination of two drugs in combination therapy has an effect lower than the sum of the effects of the two drugs acting independently, also known as antagonistic effect, the drugs will seldom be prescribed together in the same therapy.

Drug or chemical combinations with additive effects can cause adverse effects. For example, co-administration of non-steroidal anti-inflammatory drugs (NSAIDs) and glucocorticoids increases the risk of gastric bleeding.

== History ==
The concept of additive effect is derived from the concept of drug synergy. Thus, the origin of additive effect dates back to the early twentieth century when the search for synergy started. During the search for synergy, the models of Loewe additivity and Bliss independence were proposed. These models are capable of measuring the effects of drug combinations. Hence, Loewe additivity and Bliss independence were developed to determine whether an effect of a drug combination is synergistic or antagonistic. During the construction of these models, the concept of additive effect was introduced as the baseline for the determination of synergy and antagonism.

== Types of Additive Effect ==
Additive effects can occur with drugs with either equivalent or overlapping actions, or independent actions.

=== Equivalent or overlapping actions ===
Many of the drugs in the same class exert additive effect as they have a similar therapeutic mechanism of action. For example, the calcium carbonate, magnesium, and aluminium salts are all antacids with the mechanism of using the negative ion to neutralize the acid in the stomach. The antacids have no interaction between them, so they would be considered to have additive effect when taken together.

Drugs that are in the same class, but do not have the same target, may also act additively by interacting with different targets in the same pathway. For example, propofol and sevoflurane can both produce anesthetic effects. Propofol can potentiate the activity of GABA_{A} receptor and act on α, β and γ subunits, while sevoflurane enhances the response of the GABA_{A} receptor to endogenous GABA by binding to the α1-subunit. By using Dixon up-down method, a trial has shown that the effect in producing anesthetic effects between propofol and sevoflurane is additive.

=== Independent actions ===
Two drugs having different targets in unrelated pathways that ultimately result in the desired therapeutic result are considered to have additive effects with independent actions. For example, artemisinin and curcumin both exert antimalarial effects. Artemisinin works by being metabolized in the body into active metabolites. The metabolites would then create reactive oxygen species(ROS) that damage the parasites and kill them. The mechanism of action of curcumin remains largely unknown, but the antiparasitic effect is believed to be associated with the potentiation of innate and adaptive immunological responses. The combined effects of artemisinin and curcumin each contribute to the death of parasites via different mechanisms and the effect is shown to be additive by fractional inhibitory concentrations.

Drugs with the same target in different sites that produce additive effects are also considered as independent action. For example, doxorubicin and trabectedin can both produce anticancer effect. Doxorubicin is a DNA intercalator that prefers to bind to AT regions, while trabectedin forms guanine adduct in DNA to disrupt DNA repair system. A recent study has shown that doxorubicin and trabectedin do not hinder each other and could produce an additive anticancer effect.

== Common misconceptions ==
The concept of additive effect is analogous to the concept of simple addition in mathematics. However, the additive effect is not simply the arithmetic summation of two (or more) drugs in most cases. For an additive inhibition effect, drug A and drug B could each inhibit 20% individually, but the additive effect is not 40%. The effect cannot be simply arithmetic because if drug A and drug B each inhibits 60% cannot theoretically exert an inhibitory effect of 120%. With 60% inhibitory effect each, the remaining function would be at (1-60%)×(1-60%)=16%, meaning the additive inhibitory effect would be 84%. Since the application of additive effect is commonly seen in clinical practice, avoiding the common misconceptions of additive effect is crucial to understanding the clinical significance of additive effect.

== Clinical Significance ==
=== Detection of synergy ===
One of the typical uses of additive effect is to detect synergy. Additive effect can be considered as the baseline effect in methods of determining the presence of synergistic effect between two or more drugs. Synergistic effect is similar to additive effect. The only difference is it has a combination effect greater than additive effect. To be brief, synergy can produce an effect of 2 + 2 > 4 when drugs are used in combination. The combination of angiotensin II receptor antagonist (ARB), Candesartan-cilexetil, and angiotensin-converting enzyme inhibitor (ACEI), Ramipril, demonstrates a synergistic effect in reducing systolic blood pressure.

=== Detection of antagonism ===
The other use of additive effect is to detect antagonism. Similarly, additive effect can be considered as the baseline effect in methods of determining the presence of antagonistic effect between drugs. Pharmacists can confirm the presence of antagonism when the combination effect of drugs is less than additive effect. The combination of acetylsalicylic acid and ibuprofen demonstrates an antagonistic effect in relieving pain and inflammation.

=== Combination therapy ===
The most common clinical usage of additive effect in pharmacology is combination therapy. Two or more therapeutic agents are used in combination therapy to treat a single disease. Different drugs in the same combination therapy act on different biological and biochemical pathways in the body to produce an additive effect.

An example of combination therapy demonstrating additive effect is the use of β-2 adrenergic receptor agonists together with inhaled corticosteroids. This is a treatment for two commonly seen pulmonary diseases, asthma and chronic obstructive pulmonary disease. β-2 adrenergic receptor agonists act as bronchodilators, having an effect of inducing bronchodilation to relieve bronchoconstriction; Inhaled corticosteroids act as anti-inflammatory drugs to decrease the inflammatory response. The two drugs act on different sites in the body. The corticosteroids also reverse and restore the function and number of β-2 adrenergic receptors in patients’ lungs in vivo. Meanwhile, the combined activity of two drugs resolves the problem of reduced sensitivity in some patients with chronic obstructive pulmonary disease towards inhaled corticosteroids. A common drug from this example can be found is Seretide®, containing a long-acting β-2 adrenergic receptor agonist named as Salmeterol and a corticosteroid named as Fluticasone.

Additive interaction can also be found in combination therapy for treating hypertension. The combination of angiotensin II receptor blockers (ARBs) and calcium channel blockers (CCBs) is one of the suggested antihypertensive therapies. ARBs inhibit the action of angiotensin II to decrease fluid retention and blood volume to decrease blood pressure, reduce vasoconstriction to decrease peripheral vascular resistance, and prevent vascular fibrosis to decrease vascular stiffness. CCBs are vasodilators inhibiting L-type voltage-operated calcium channels in the blood vessels to alleviate vasoconstriction resulting in a decrease in peripheral vascular resistance. The two types of drugs act on different pathways to produce an additive effect on lowering blood pressure without any increase in adverse effects. This combination, with ARB, valsartan, and CCB, amlodipine, is a common treatment in high-risk hypertensive patients, especially the elderly.

The treatment for another common disease, primary hypercholesterolemia, also demonstrates additive effect. Plant sterol-ester margarine and a common type of antihyperlipidaemic drug, cerivastatin, have an additive effect in reducing LDL cholesterol, without significant interaction between the two drugs. Another drug combination with additive effect for hypercholesterolemia is niacin (vitamin B3) and simvastatin. This drug combination is also known as Simcor commercially. Niacin can reduce the secretion of LDL cholesterol and very-low-density lipoprotein cholesterol (VLDL cholesterol). On the other hand, simvastatin can reduce the synthesis of LDL cholesterol and triglycerides, and increase the level of high-density lipoprotein cholesterol (HDL cholesterol). Together, niacin and simvastatin reduce the level of LDL cholesterol and increases the level of HDL cholesterol, therefore managing hypercholesterolemia effectively.

=== Optimal dosing ===
Additive interaction or additive effect can be found in the treatment of the majority of common diseases. The combination of drugs with different effects has the benefit of using each drug at its optimal dose. This decreases the possibility of using a higher dose of a single medication if the previous dose is ineffective in treating diseases or relieving symptoms. The significance of using drugs with optimal dose is lowering the occurrence of intolerable side effects, adverse reactions, and possible drug toxicity in patient's body. This increases the safe use of drugs and increases patient compliance with the therapy.

One of the examples is the use of calcium channel blocker and beta-blocker. They are drugs that can be used to treat stable angina. They can both decrease the frequency of angina, aiming to relieve the symptoms of angina. There are controlled, double blind clinical trials and studies involving patients with preserved left ventricular function demonstrating that the combination of calcium channel blocker and beta blocker has an additive cardio depressant effects when comparing with either drug class alone. The combination therapy is used when a single medication fails to produce a therapeutic effect. Choosing the optimal dose of the two medications in the combination therapy prevents the use of an extreme high dose of a single medication alone, leading to adverse effects.

== Adverse Effects ==
Drug combinations with additive effects have the potential to cause adverse effects. Adverse effects induced by drug combinations are not uncommon. The risk of having adverse effects is increased when the drug combination with additive effect has the same adverse effect. Thus, some drug combinations with additive effect are avoided. Below are commonly seen drug combinations with additive effect causing adverse effects.

=== ACEI and potassium-sparing diuretics ===
An example demonstrating how drug combination with additive effect can cause adverse effects is the co-administration of ACEI and potassium-sparing diuretics. Despite having different mechanisms of action, the drugs are able to reduce potassium excretion from the body. Hence, both ACEI and potassium-sparing diuretics have the side effect of hyperkalemia. When two drugs are used together, the risk of having hyperkalemia is doubled. Since hyperkalemia has the potential to cause arrhythmia and metabolic acidosis, the combination of ACEI and potassium-sparing diuretics is avoided.

=== NSAIDs and glucocorticoids ===
Another example is the combination of non-steroidal anti-inflammatory drugs (NSAIDs) and glucocorticoids. Although NSAIDs and glucocorticoids have different mechanisms of action, the drugs are able to diminish the protective effect of gastric mucosa from gastric acid. As a result, the concomitant use of NSAIDs and glucocorticoids increases the risk of gastric bleeding and worsens peptic ulcer disease. As a result, the combination of NSAIDs and glucocorticoids is not recommended.

== See also ==
- Antibiotic synergy
