= Cryptobacterium =

Scientific classification
- Domain: Bacteria
- Kingdom: Bacillati
- Phylum: Actinomycetota
- Class: Coriobacteriia
- Order: Eggerthellales
- Family: Eggerthellaceae
- Genus: Cryptobacterium; Nakazawa et al. 1999

Type species
- Cryptobacterium curtum Nakazawa et al. 1999

Species
- C. curtum

Genus of bacteria

Cryptobacterium is a genus of Actinomycetota, in the family Coriobacteriaceae. Up to now there is only one species of this genus known (Cryptobacterium curtum).
