= Antibiotic synergy =

Synergic effect of antibiotics

Antibiotic synergy is one of three responses possible when two or more antibiotics are used simultaneously to treat an infection. In the synergistic response, the applied antibiotics work together to produce an effect more potent than if each antibiotic were applied singly. Compare to the additive effect, where the potency of an antibiotic combination is roughly equal to the combined potencies of each antibiotic singly, and antagonistic effect, where the potency of the combination is less than the combined potencies of each antibiotic. Common methods for determining antibiotic synergy in vitro include checkerboard assays, Etests and time-kill assays.

== Clinical interest ==
Clinical interest in synergism dates back to the early 1950s when practitioners noted that patients with enterococcal endocarditis experienced a high relapse rate when penicillin G alone was used for treatment and a demonstrably lower relapse rate when streptomycin was combined with penicillin G to combat the infection. Since that time the research community has conducted numerous studies regarding the effects and possibilities of antibiotic combinations. Today, combination therapy is recognized as providing a broad spectrum of antibiotic coverage, effectively fighting polymicrobial infections, minimizing selection for antibiotic resistant strains, lowering dose toxicity where applicable, and in some cases providing synergistic activity.

== Desirability ==
Antibiotic synergy is desirable in a clinic sense for several reasons. At the patient level, the boosted antimicrobial potency provided by synergy allows the body to more rapidly clear infections, resulting in shorter courses of antibiotic therapy. Shorter courses of therapy in turn reduce the effects of dose-related toxicity, if applicable. Additionally, synergy aids in total bacterial eradication, more completely removing an infection than would be possible without synergy. At a higher level, synergistic effects are useful for combating resistant bacterial strains through increased potency and for stalling the spread of bacterial resistance through the total eradication of infections, preventing the evolutionary selection of resistant cells and strains.

== Current research directions ==
Current research on antibiotic synergy and potential therapies is moving in three primary directions. Some research is devoted to finding combinations of extant antibiotics which when combined exhibit synergy. A classic example of this effect is the interaction between β-lactams, which damage the bacteria cell membrane, and aminoglycosides, which inhibit protein synthesis. The damage dealt to the cell wall by β-lactams allows more aminoglycoside molecules to be taken up into the cell than would otherwise be possible, enhancing cell damage. In some cases, antibacterial combinations restore potency to ineffective drugs. Other research has been devoted to finding antibiotic resistance breakers (ARB's) which enhance an antibiotic's potency. This effect is mediated through direct antibacterial activity of the ARB, targeting and destroying mechanisms of bacterial resistance thereby allowing the antibiotic to function properly, interacting with the host to trigger defensive mechanisms, or some combination thereof. The third direction of research involves combining traditional antibiotics with unconventional bactericides such as silver nano particles. Silver nano particles have strong non-specific interactions with bacterial cells that result in cell wall deformation and the generation of damaging reactive oxygen species (ROS) in the presence of cellular components. These effects are thought to weaken bacterial cells, making them more susceptible to assault from conventional antibiotics.
