= Eggerthella lenta =

Scientific classification
- Domain: Bacteria
- Kingdom: Bacillati
- Phylum: Actinomycetota
- Class: Coriobacteriia
- Order: Eggerthellales
- Family: Eggerthellaceae
- Genus: Eggerthella
- Species: E. lenta

Binomial name
- Eggerthella lenta Eggerth, 1935

Bacteria present in humans

Eggerthella lenta is a Gram-positive, anaerobic species of bacteria which comprises part of the human microbiome. It has been found in the human gastrointestinal tract, female reproductive system and male prostate. Occasionally it can cause disease by spreading to other areas, including bloodstream infections, liver abscesses, bacterial vaginosis and meningitis.

During a pre clinical model, Eggerthella lenta was found to reduce amino acids such as arginine, citrulline and tryptophan metabolites to levels found in older persons and can trigger autoimmune responses before the onset of the clinical symptoms of rheumatoid arthritis in which the immune system produces autoantibodies that mistakenly target and attack the body's tissues and cells instead of invading viruses or bacteria.

E. lenta levels are enriched in inflammatory bowel disease, and the bacterium has been shown to activate T helper 17 cells. It has been shown to worsen colitis in mice models. E. lenta has been found to be present in higher levels in the gut of people with Graves' disease.

E. lenta has been shown to inactivate the cardiac drug digoxin.

The species was known until 1999 as Eubacterium lentum.
