= Olsenella =

Scientific classification
- Domain: Bacteria
- Kingdom: Bacillati
- Phylum: Actinomycetota
- Class: Coriobacteriia
- Order: Coriobacteriales
- Family: Atopobiaceae
- Genus: Olsenella; Dewhirst et al. 2001

Type species
- Olsenella uli (Olsen et al. 1991) Dewhirst et al. 2001

Species
- O. absiana; "O. congonensis"; O. intestinalis; O. kribbiana; "O. lakotia"; O. massiliensis; O. phocaeensis; O. porci; O. profusa; O. uli; O. urininfantis

Genus of bacteria

Olsenella is a Gram-positive, non-spore-forming, obligate anaerobic and non-motile bacterial genus from the family Atopobiaceae. Olsenella is named after the microbiologist Ingar Olsen. Olsenella bacteria are involved in endodontic infections in humans.

== Phylogeny ==
The currently accepted taxonomy is based on the List of Prokaryotic names with Standing in Nomenclature (LPSN) and National Center for Biotechnology Information (NCBI).

16S rRNA based LTP_10_2024

- Olsenella
  - O. profusa
  - - O. phocaeensis
    - - O. massiliensis
      - - O. uli
        - - O. porci
          - O. urininfantis

120 marker proteins based GTDB 10-RS226

- Olsenella
  - O. uli (Olsen et al. 1991) Dewhirst et al. 2001
  - - - O. phocaeensis Ricaboni et al. 2017 ex Zgheib et al. 2021
      - O. urininfantis Zgheib et al. 2021
    - - O. massiliensis Zgheib et al. 2021
      - O. profusa Dewhirst et al. 2001
