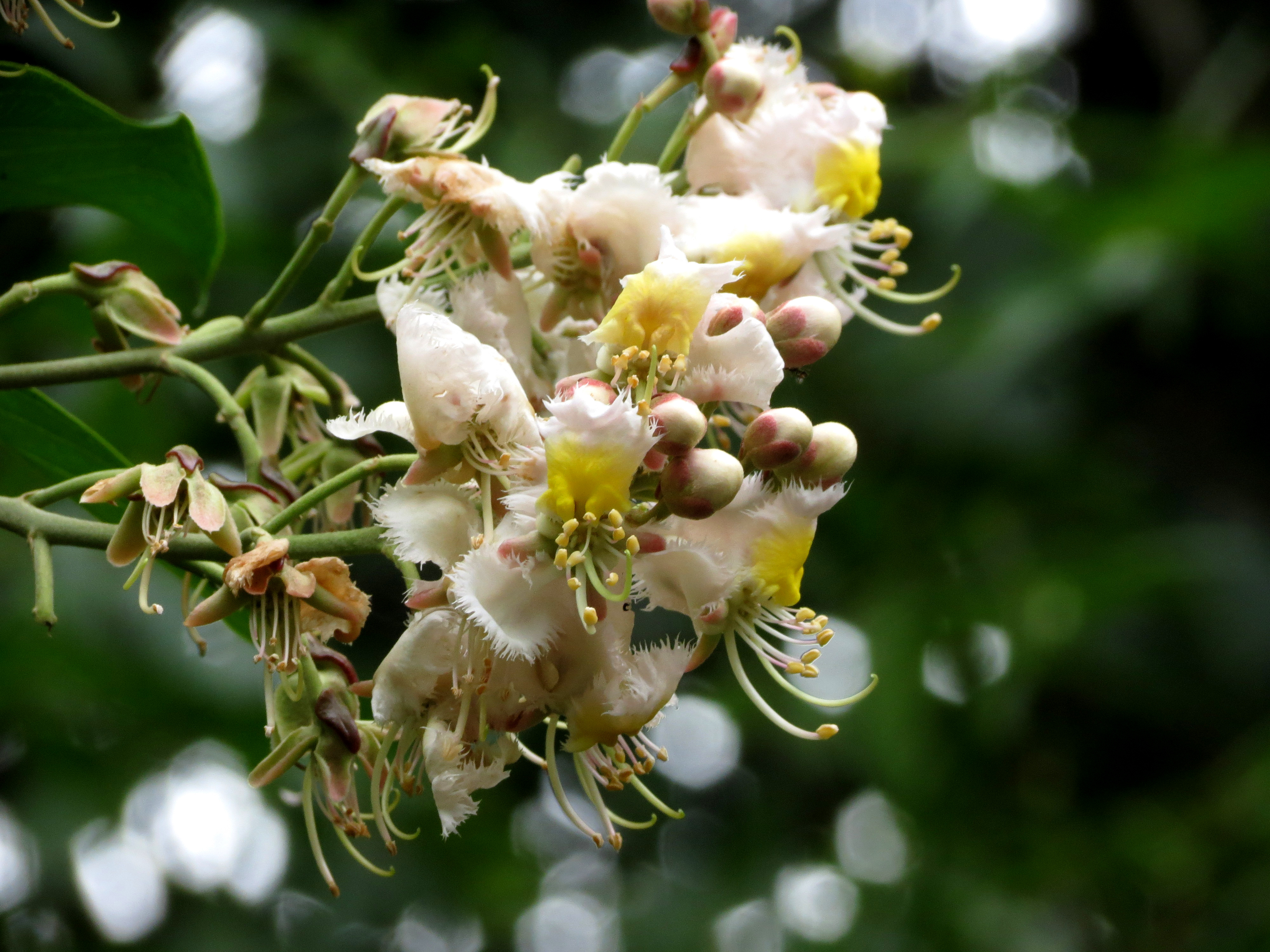

Scientific classification
- Kingdom: Plantae
- Clade: Embryophytes
- Clade: Tracheophytes
- Clade: Spermatophytes
- Clade: Angiosperms
- Clade: Eudicots
- Clade: Rosids
- Order: Malpighiales
- Family: Malpighiaceae
- Genus: Hiptage
- Species: H. benghalensis

Binomial name
- Hiptage benghalensis (L.) Kurz

= Hiptage benghalensis =

Species of flowering plant

Hiptage benghalensis, often simply called hiptage, is a perennial, evergreen liana native to India, Southeast Asia, Taiwan, and the Philippines. Its habitat is variable and prefers climates ranging from warm temperate to tropical. In Hawaii, where H. benghalensis is considered a weed, as it is in Australia, Mauritius and Réunion, it grows from sea level to 1,000 m (3,281 ft). H. benghalensis is cultivated for its white-pink scented flowers.

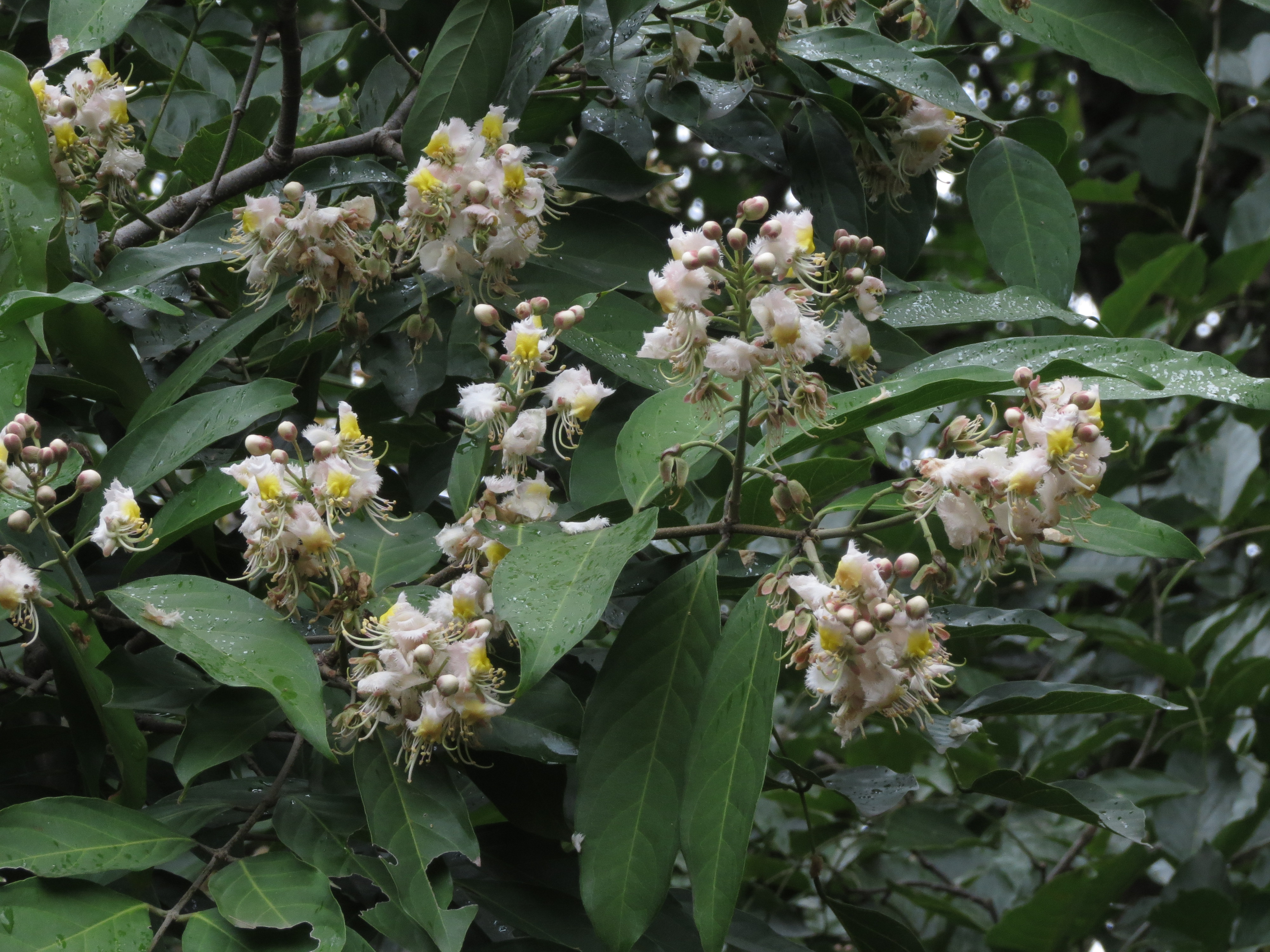
Flowers

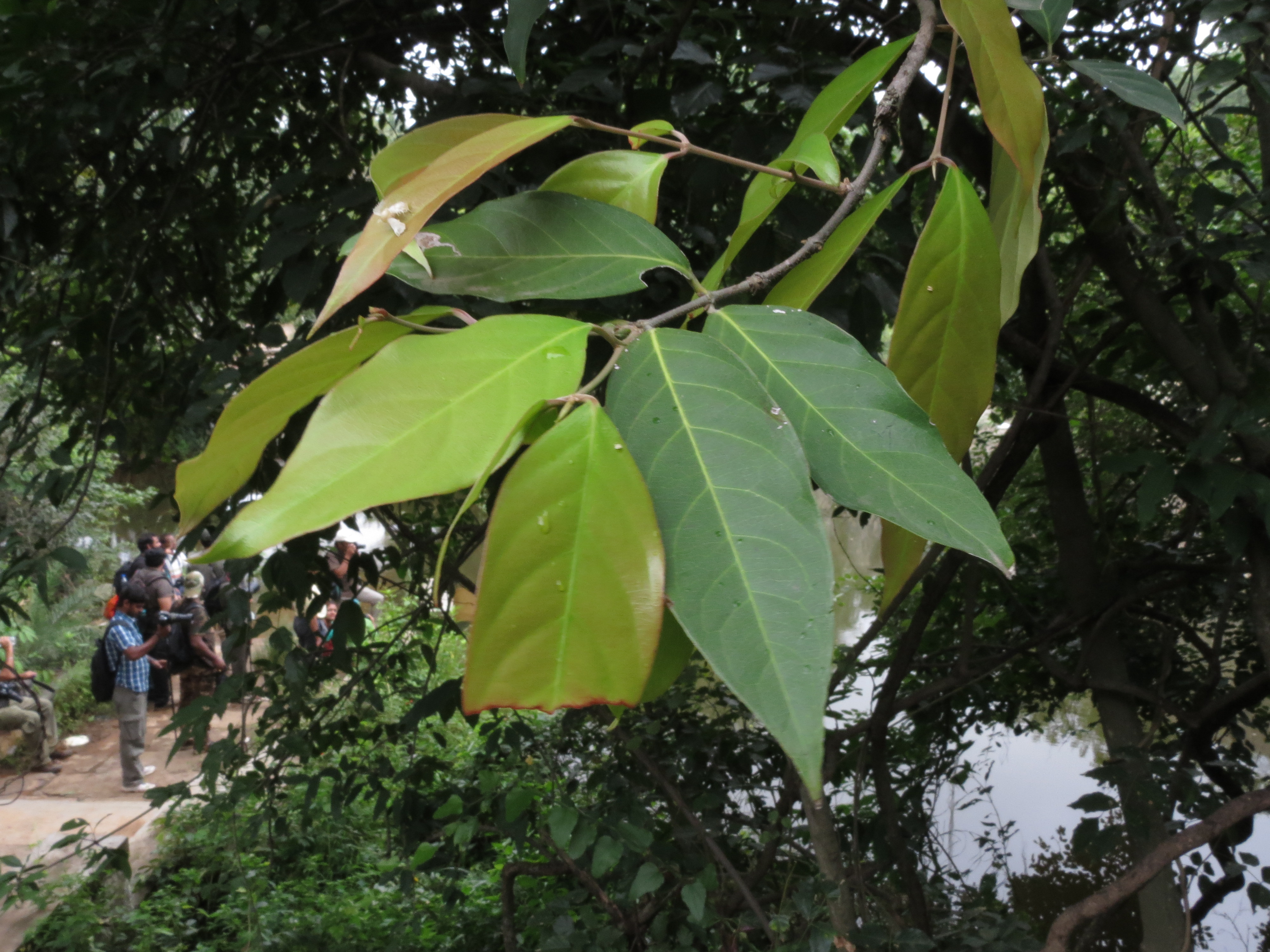
Leaves

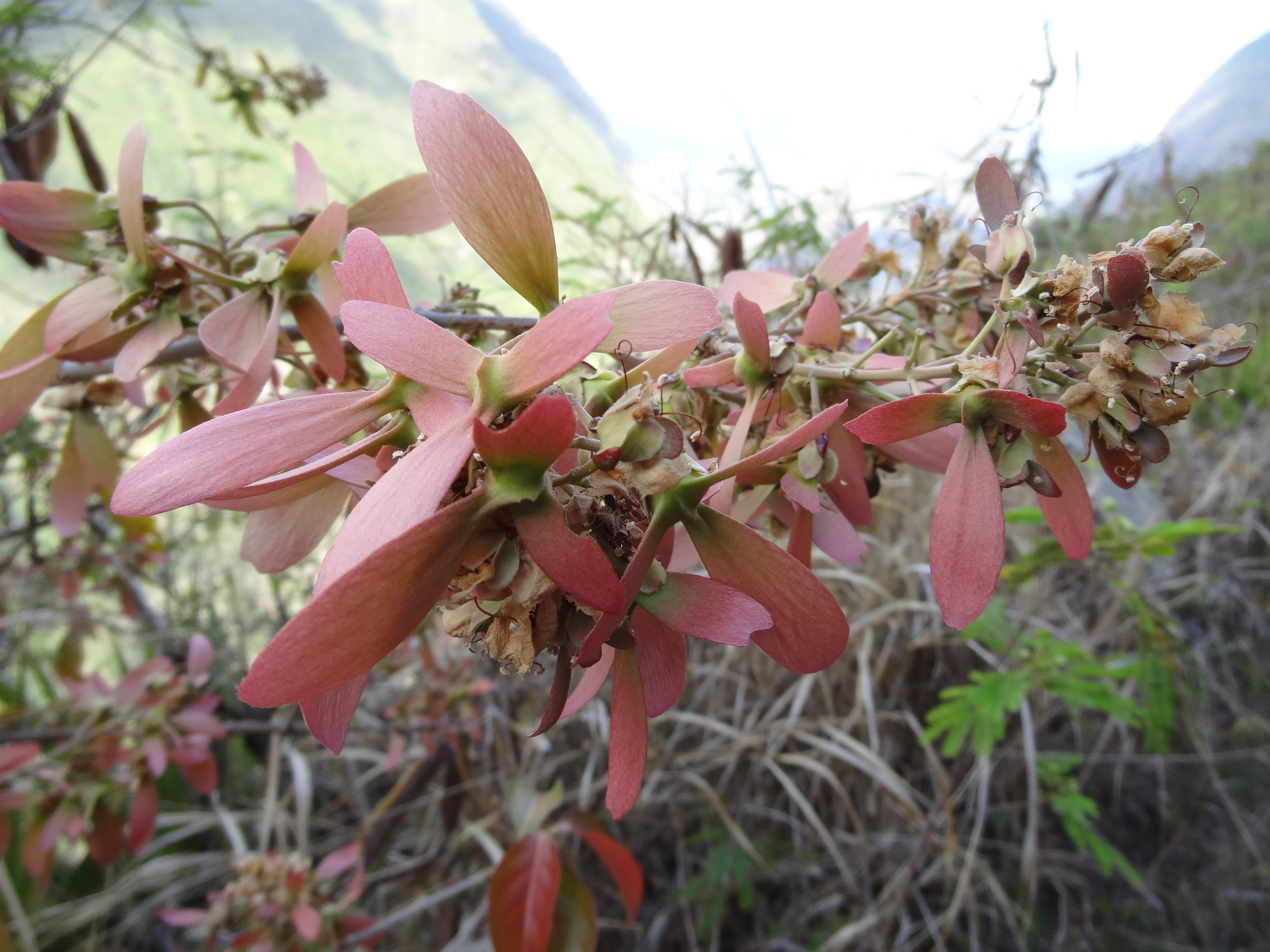
Fruits

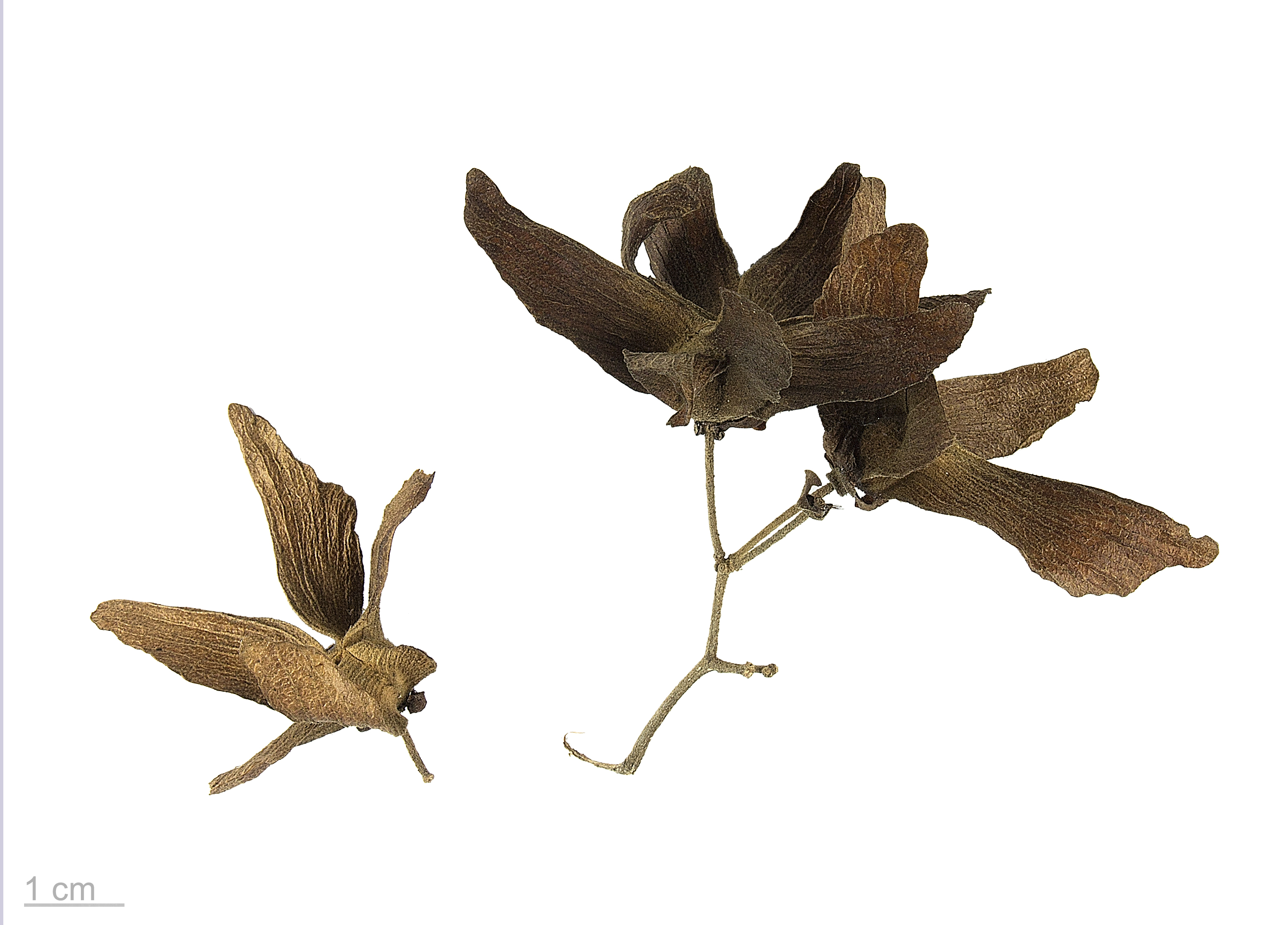
Hiptage benghalensis - MHNT

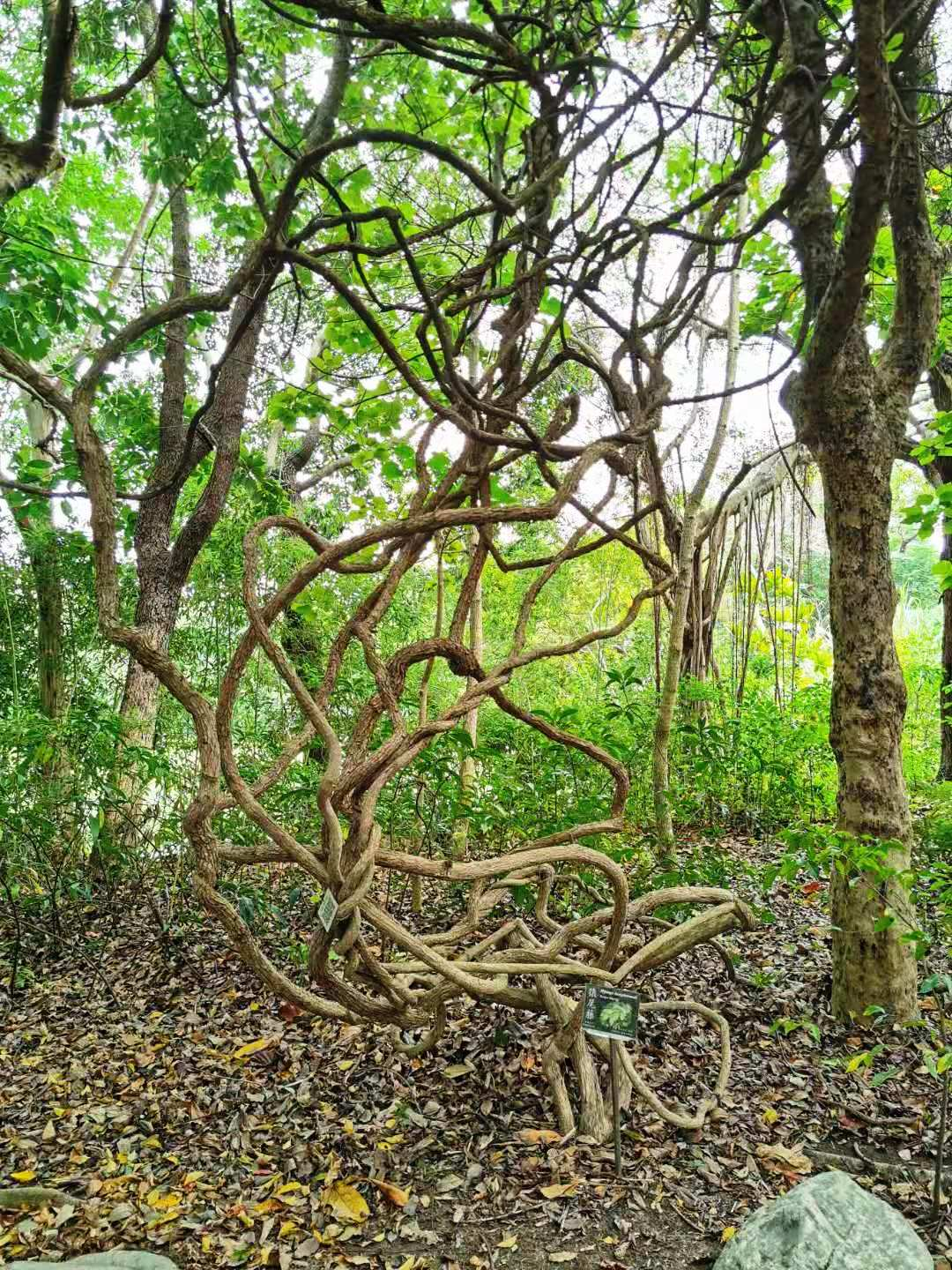
Liana

== Etymology and names ==
The genus name, Hiptage, is derived from the Greek hiptamai, which means "to fly" and refers its unique three-winged fruit known as "samara". "Benghalensis" is derived from the historic region of Bengal, where it is a native species. Taxonomic synonyms for H. benghalensis include:

- Banisteria benghalensis L.
- Banisteria tetraptera Sonnerat
- Banisteria unicapsularis Lam.
- Gaertnera indica J.F.Gmel.
- Gaertnera obtusifolia (DC.) Roxb.
- Gaertnera racemosa Vahl H. madablota Gaertn.
- Hiptage benghalensis (L.) Kunz forma longifolia Nied.
- Hiptage benghalensis (L.) Kurz forma cochinchinensis Pierre
- Hiptage benghalensis (L.) Kurz forma latifolia Nied.
- Hiptage benghalensis (L.) Kurz forma macroptera (Merr.) Nied.
- Hiptage benghalensis (L.) Kurz forma typica Nied.
- Hiptage javanica Blume
- Hiptage macroptera Merr.
- Hiptage madablota Gaertn.
- Hiptage malaiensis Nied.
- Hiptage obtusifolia DC.
- Hiptage pinnata Elmer
- Hiptage teysmannii Arènes
- Hiptage trialata Span.
- Molina racemosa Cav.
- Succowia fimbriata Dennst.
- Triopteris jamaicensis L.

H. benghalensis has several vernacular names, including madhavi, vasantduti, chandravalli, madhalata, madhumalati, and madhavilata.

== Description ==
H. benghalensis is a stout, high-climbing liana or large shrub, with white or yellowish hairs on the stem. Its leaves are lanceolate to ovate-lanceolate and approximately 20 cm (8 in) long, and 9 cm (4 in) broad; petioles are up to 1 cm long. It has scandent branches up to 5 m (16 ft) high.

H. benghalensis flowers intermittently during the year, and produces fragrant flowers borne in compact ten-to-thirty-flowered axillary racemes. The flowers are pink to white, with yellow marks. Fruits are samaras with three spreading, papery oblanceolate to elliptic wings, 2–5 cm long, and propagate via wind or by cuttings.

== Range ==
Hiptage benghalensis is a native of India, Southeast Asia and the Philippines. It has been recorded as a weed in Australian rain forests and is invasive in Mauritius, Réunion, Florida and Hawaii where it thrives in dry lowland forests, forming impenetrable thickets and smothering native vegetation. The Florida Exotic Pest Plant Council (FLEPPC) listed H. benghalensis among Category II plants in 2001, which are species that have shown a potential to disrupt native plant communities.

== Uses ==
H. benghalensis is widely cultivated in the tropics for its attractive and fragrant flowers; it can be trimmed to form a small tree or shrub or can be trained as a vine. It is also occasionally cultivated for medicinal purposes in the alternative medicine practice ayurveda: the leaves and bark are hot, acrid, bitter, insecticidal, vulnerary and useful in the treatment of biliousness, cough, burning sensation, thirst and inflammation; it also has the ability to treat skin diseases and leprosy.

== Notes and references ==
Footnotes

References

- Bailey, L. H./Bailey, E. Z. 1976. Hortus third: A concise dictionary of plants cultivated in the United States and Canada, Macmillan, New York.
- Agharkar, S.P. 1991. Medicinal plants of Bombay presidency, Scientific Publishes, Jodhpur, India
- Verma, D.M./Balakrishnan, M.P./ Dixit, R.D. 1993. Flora of Madhya Pradesh. Vol. I., Botanical Survey of India, Kolkata, India
