= Adlercreutzia =

Scientific classification
- Domain: Bacteria
- Kingdom: Bacillati
- Phylum: Actinomycetota
- Class: Coriobacteriia
- Order: Eggerthellales
- Family: Eggerthellaceae
- Genus: Adlercreutzia; Maruo et al. 2008

Type species
- Adlercreutzia equolifaciens Maruo et al. 2008

Species
- A. caecicola; A. caecimuris; A. equolifaciens; A. faecimuris; A. hattorii; A. mucosicola; A. muris; A. rubneri; A. shanghongiae; A. wanghongyangiae

Synonyms
- Asaccharobacter Minamida et al. 2008; Enterorhabdus Clavel et al. 2009

Genus of bacteria

Adlercreutzia is a genus in the phylum Actinomycetota (Bacteria).

== Etymology ==
The generic name derives from H. Adlercreutz, a professor at the University of Helsinki in Finland, for his contributions to research on the effects of phytoestrogens on human health.

== Taxonomy ==
In 2018, Nouioui et al. proposed merging the genera Asaccharobacter, Enterorhabdus and Parvibacter within the genus Adlercreutzia based on observed clustering of these genera within phylogenetic trees. However, subsequent phylogenetic analyses observed that Parvibacter caecicola exhibited much deeper branching compared to other Adlercreutzia species. Additionally, five conserved signature indels (CSIs) present in the proteins excinuclease ABC subunit UvrA, flavodoxin-dependent (E)-4-hydroxy-3-methylbut-2-enyl-diphosphate synthase, phosphoribosylformylglycinamidine synthase, valine-tRNA ligase and cysteine–tRNA ligase were identified to be exclusively shared by all Adlercreutzia species with the exception of P. caecicola. Thus, the emended description of the genus Adlercreutzia is the same as given before, with the exclusion of P. caecicola, which has been transferred back into the genus Parvibacter.

=== Phylogeny ===
The currently accepted taxonomy is based on the List of Prokaryotic names with Standing in Nomenclature (LPSN) and National Center for Biotechnology Information (NCBI).

16S rRNA based LTP_10_2024

- Adlercreutzia
  - - A. muris (Lagkouvardos et al. 2016) Nouioui et al. 2018
    - - A. caecimuris (Clavel et al. 2010) Nouioui et al. 2018
      - A. mucosicola (Clavel et al. 2009) Nouioui et al. 2018
  - - A. caecicola (Clavel et al. 2013) Nouioui et al. 2018
    - - A. equolifaciens Maruo et al. 2008
      - A. hattorii Sakamoto et al. 2021

120 marker proteins based GTDB 10-RS226

- - - Adlercreutzia faecimuris Suh et al. 2024
    - Parvibacter caecicola Clavel et al. 2013 [Adlercreutzia caecicola]
  - - Adlercreutzia
      - A. murintestinalis Afrizal et al. 2025
      - - - A. equolifaciens
          - A. hattorii [incl. A. rubneri Stoll et al. 2021]
        - - A. caecimuris
          - - A. muris
            - A. mucosicola
