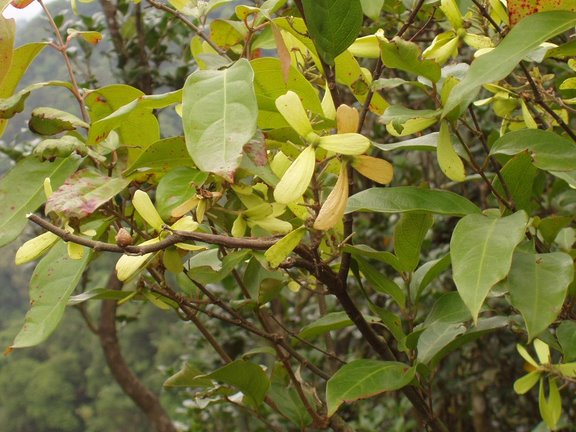
- H. benghalensis (L.) Kurz

Scientific classification
- Kingdom: Plantae
- Clade: Tracheophytes
- Clade: Angiosperms
- Clade: Eudicots
- Clade: Rosids
- Order: Malpighiales
- Family: Malpighiaceae
- Genus: Hiptage; Gaertn.

= Hiptage =

Genus of flowering plants

Hiptage is a genus in the Malpighiaceae, a family of about 75 genera of flowering plants in the order Malpighiales. Hiptage species are native to: Andaman Is., Assam, Bangladesh, Borneo, Cambodia, China South-Central, China Southeast, East Himalaya, Fiji, Hainan, India, Jawa, Laos, Lesser Sunda Is., Malaya, Myanmar, Nepal, Nicobar Is., Pakistan, Philippines, Sri Lanka, Sulawesi, Sumatera, Taiwan, Thailand, Vietnam. The genus is distinctive in its three-winged samaras; most species bear an elongated commissural gland on the calyx.

The most widely known species is Hiptage benghalensis, native to tropical and subtropical Asia. it is widely cultivated for its showy fragrant flowers, and its true native range is difficult to assess. This species often escapes from cultivation; it spreads aggressively and can become a pernicious weed.
