= Eggerthella =

Scientific classification
- Domain: Bacteria
- Kingdom: Bacillati
- Phylum: Actinomycetota
- Class: Coriobacteriia
- Order: Eggerthellales
- Family: Eggerthellaceae
- Genus: Eggerthella; Wade et al., 1999

Type species
- Eggerthella lenta (Eggerth 1935) Wade et al. 1999

Species
- E. guodeyinii; E. hominis; E. lenta; E. sinensis; E. timonensis

Genus of bacteria

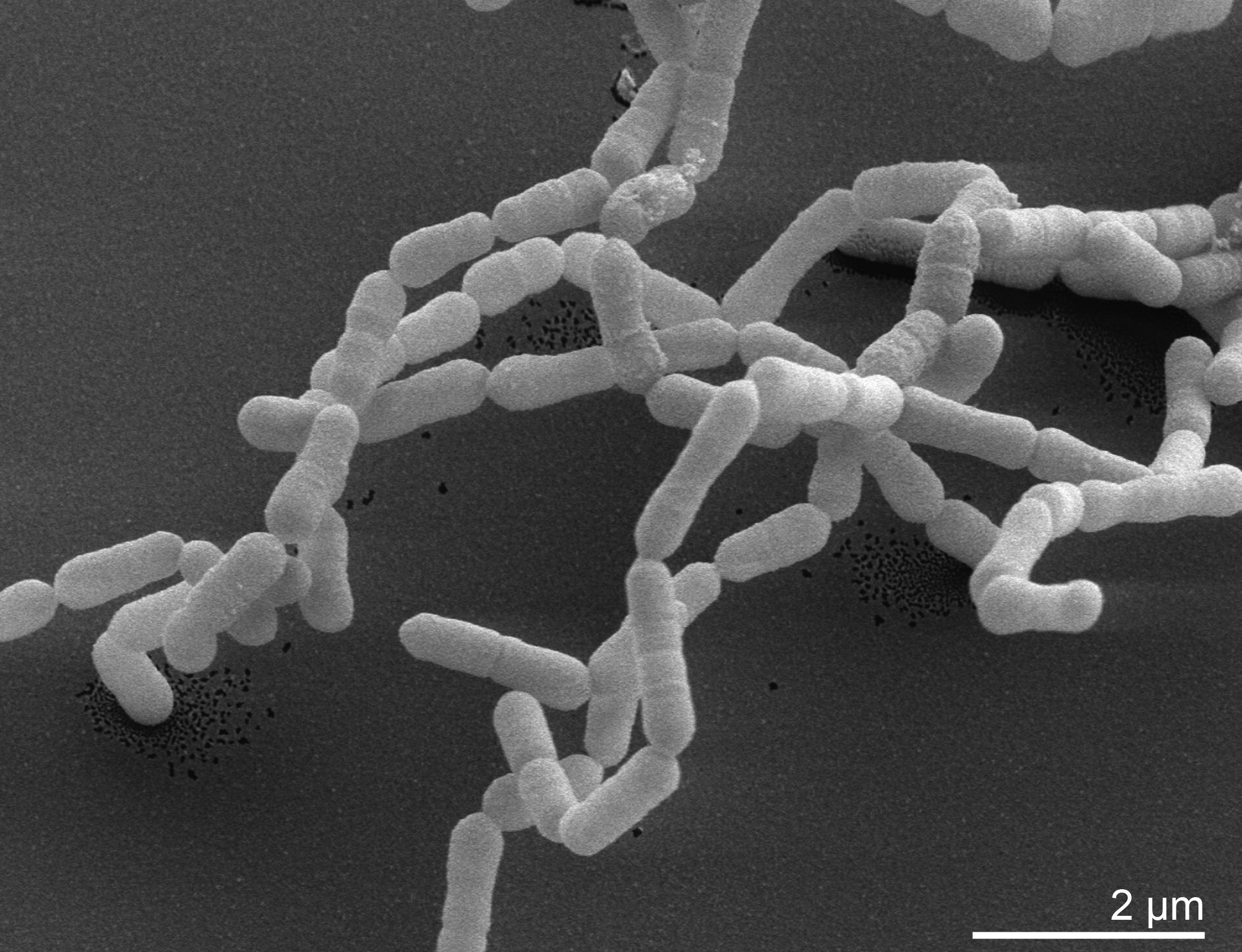
Eggerthella lenta

Eggerthella is a bacterial genus of Actinomycetota, in the family Coriobacteriaceae. Members of this genus are anaerobic, non-sporulating, non-motile, Gram-positive bacilli that grow singly, as pairs, or in short chains. They are found in the human colon and feces and have been implicated as a cause of ulcerative colitis, liver and anal abscesses and systemic bacteremia.

The type strain for this genus, Eggerthella lenta, was known as Eubacterium lentum prior to 1999. The genus is named for Arnold Eggerth, who first described the organism in 1935.

Eggerthella has not been characterized well because of identification difficulties. Only 9 case reports involving Eggerthella bacteremia had been published prior to 2014. It is "most commonly associated with intra-abdominal infections, which are often polymicrobial."

== Phylogeny ==
The currently accepted taxonomy is based on the List of Prokaryotic names with Standing in Nomenclature (LPSN) and National Center for Biotechnology Information (NCBI).

16S rRNA based LTP_10_2024

- Eggerthella
  - E. sinensis
  - - E. timonensis
    - - E. guodeyinii
      - E. lenta

120 marker proteins based GTDB 10-RS226

- Eggerthella
  - E. sinensis Lau et al. 2006
  - - E. lenta (Eggerth 1935) Wade et al. 1999
    - - E. guodeyinii Ge et al. 2021
      - E. timonensis Bilen et al. 2023

== See also ==
- List of bacterial vaginosis microbiota
