= Loewe additivity =

Reference model for measuring drug combination effects

In toxicodynamics and pharmacodynamics, Loewe additivity (or dose additivity) is one of several common reference models used for measuring the effects of drug combinations.

== Definition ==
Let $d_1$ and $d_2$ be doses of compounds 1 and 2 producing in combination an effect $e$. We denote by $D_{e1}$ and $D_{e2}$ the doses of compounds 1 and 2 required to produce effect $e$ alone (assuming this conditions uniquely define them, i.e. that the individual dose-response functions are bijective). $D_{e1}/D_{e2}$ quantifies the potency of compound 1 relatively to that of compound 2.

$d_2 D_{e1}/D_{e2}$ can be interpreted as the dose $d_2$ of compound 2 converted into the corresponding dose of compound 1 after accounting for difference in potency.

Loewe additivity is defined as the situation where $d_1 + d_2 D_{e1}/D_{e2} = D_{e1}$ or $d_1 / D_{e1} + d_2/D_{e2} = 1$.

Geometrically, Loewe additivity is the situation where isoboles are segments joining the points $(D_{e1},0)$ and $(0,D_{e2})$ in the domain $(d_1,d_2)$.

If we denote by $f_1(d_1)$, $f_2(d_2)$ and $f_{12}(d_1,d_2)$ the dose-response functions of compound 1, compound 2 and of the mixture respectively, then dose additivity holds when

$$\frac{d_1}{f_1^{-1}(f_{12}(d_1,d_2))} + \frac{d_2}{f_2^{-1}(f_{12}(d_1,d_2))} = 1$$

== Testing ==
The Loewe additivity equation provides a prediction of the dose combination eliciting a given effect. Departure from Loewe additivity can be assessed informally by comparing this prediction to observations. This approach is known in toxicology as the model deviation ratio (MDR).

This approach can be rooted in a more formal statistical method with the derivation of approximate p-values with Monte Carlo simulation, as implemented in the R package MDR.
