= Slackia =

Scientific classification
- Domain: Bacteria
- Kingdom: Bacillati
- Phylum: Actinomycetota
- Class: Coriobacteriia
- Order: Eggerthellales
- Family: Eggerthellaceae
- Genus: Slackia; Wade et al. 1999

Type species
- Slackia exigua (Poco et al. 1996) Wade et al. 1999

Species
- S. equolifaciens; S. exigua; S. faecicanis; S. heliotrinireducens; S. isoflavoniconvertens; S. piriformis

Genus of bacteria

Slackia is a genus of Actinomycetota, in the family Eggerthellaceae. Slackia is named after the microbiologist Geoffrey Slack.

== Phylogeny ==
The currently accepted taxonomy is based on the List of Prokaryotic names with Standing in Nomenclature (LPSN) and National Center for Biotechnology Information (NCBI).

16S rRNA based LTP_10_2024

- Slackia
  - - S. exigua
    - S. heliotrinireducens
  - - S. isoflavoniconvertens
    - - S. equolifaciens
      - - S. faecicanis
        - S. piriformis

120 marker proteins based GTDB 10-RS226

- Slackia
  - - S. exigua (Poco et al. 1996) Wade et al. 1999
    - S. heliotrinireducens corrig. (Lanigan 1983) Wade et al. 1999
  - - S. isoflavoniconvertens Matthies, Blaut & Braune 2009
    - - S. equolifaciens Jin et al. 2010
      - - S. faecicanis Lawson et al. 2005
        - S. piriformis Nagai, Watanabe & Morotomi 2010
