= Atopobiaceae =

Scientific classification
- Domain: Bacteria
- Kingdom: Bacillati
- Phylum: Actinomycetota
- Class: Coriobacteriia
- Order: Coriobacteriales
- Family: Atopobiaceae; Gupta et al. 2013

Genera
- See text

Synonyms
- Kribbibacteriaceae Bai et al. 2024

Family of bacteria

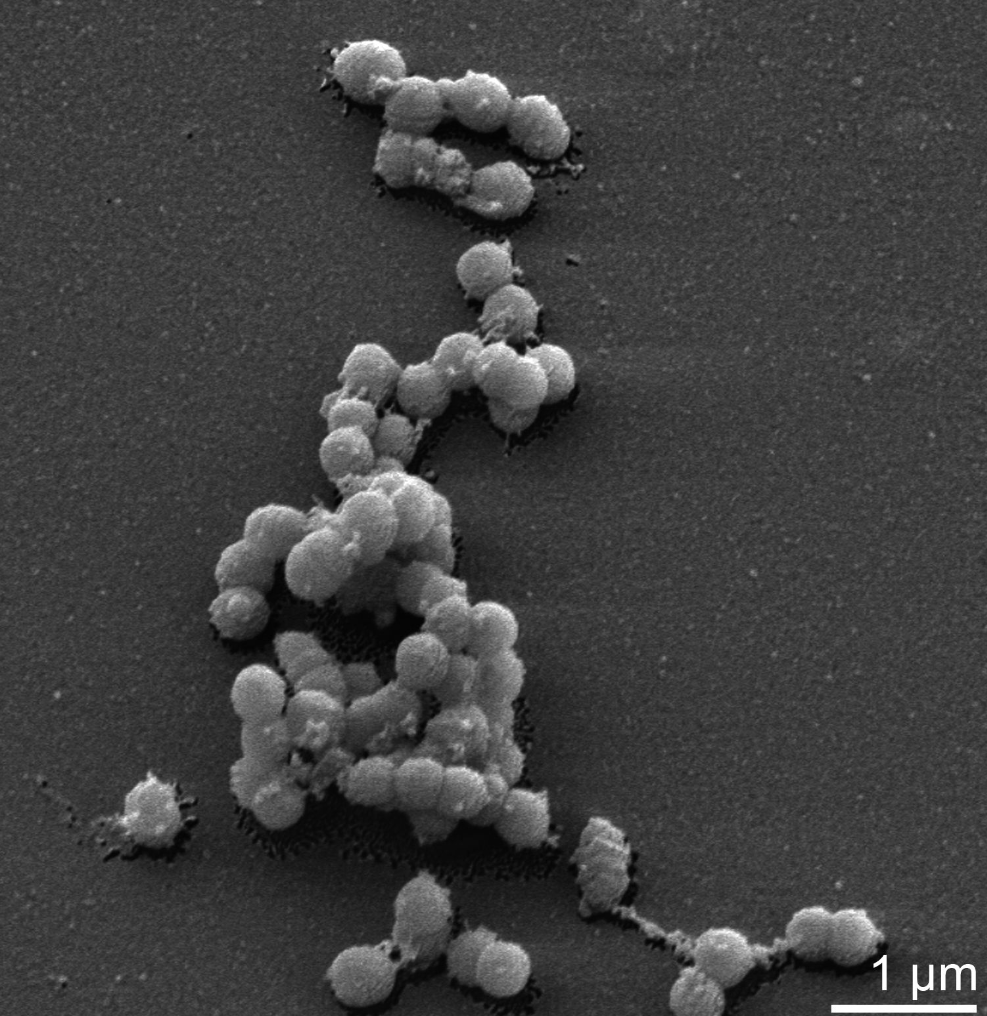

The Atopobiaceae are a family of bacteria in the phylum Actinomycetota.

== Phylogeny ==
The currently accepted taxonomy is based on the List of Prokaryotic names with Standing in Nomenclature (LPSN) and National Center for Biotechnology Information (NCBI).

Nouioui et al. 2018

- Atopobiaceae
  - Fannyhessea
  - - Lancefieldella
    - - Atopobium
      - Olsenella

16S rRNA based LTP_10_2024

- Atopobiaceae
  - - Leptogranulimonas
    - Muricaecibacterium Afrizal et al. 2023
  - - - Fannyhessea
      - - Lancefieldella
        - Atopobium
    - - - Granulimonas
        - - Parolsenella
          - - Paratractidigestivibacter
            - Tractidigestivibacter
      - - Parafannyhessea
        - - Thermophilibacter
          - Olsenella

120 marker proteins based GTDB 10-RS226

- Atopobiaceae
  - - Kribbibacterium Bai et al. 2024
    - - Granulimonas Morinaga et al. 2022
      - Leptogranulimonas Morinaga et al. 2022
  - - Parolsenella Sakamoto et al. 2018
    - - - "Ca. Coprovicinus" Gilroy et al. 2021
        - Atopobium Collins & Wallbanks 1993
      - - - "Olegusella" Diop et al. 2016
          - - Fannyhessea Nouioui et al. 2018
            - - - Olsenella porci Wylensek et al. 2021
                - Parafannyhessea Zgheib et al. 2021
              - Olsenella Dewhirst et al. 2001
        - - Tractidigestivibacter Zgheib et al. 2021
          - - Lancefieldella Nouioui et al. 2018
            - - Paratractidigestivibacter Zgheib et al. 2021
              - Thermophilibacter Zgheib et al. 2021

Unassigned genus:

- Caniella Afrizal et al. 2023
