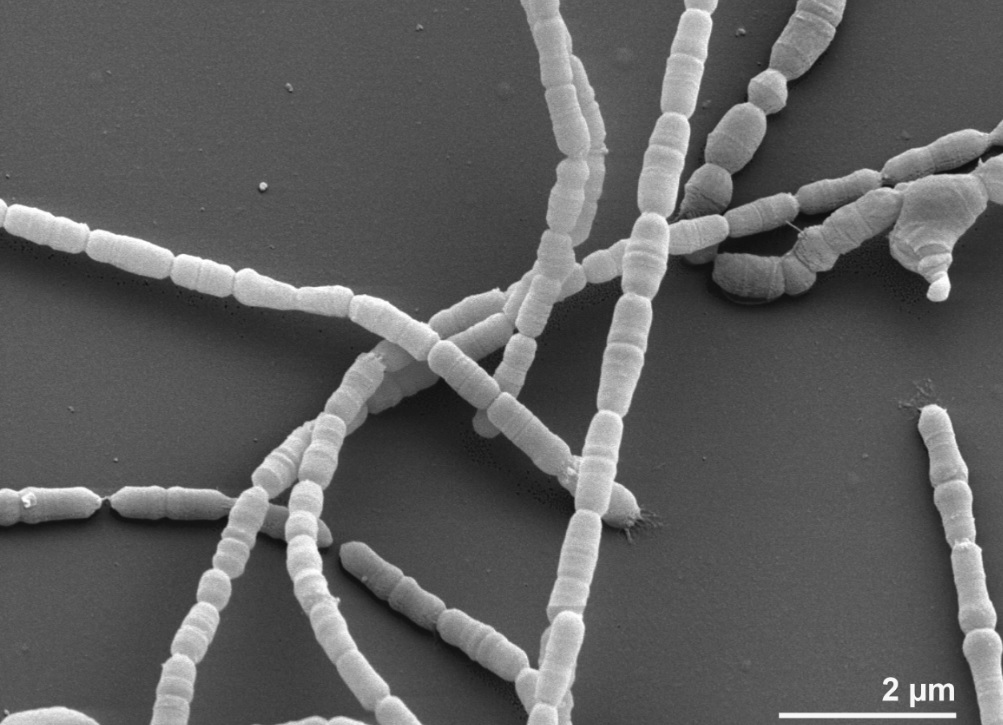
- Coriobacterium glomerans

Scientific classification
- Domain: Bacteria
- Kingdom: Bacillati
- Phylum: Actinomycetota
- Class: Coriobacteriia
- Order: Coriobacteriales; Stackebrandt et al. 1997

Families
- Atopobiaceae; Coriobacteriaceae; Eggerthellaceae; Kribbibacteriaceae

Synonyms
- "Coriobacteriineae" corrig. Garrity & Holt 2001; Eggerthellales Gupta et al. 2013

= Coriobacteriales =

Family of bacteria

The Coriobacteriales are an order of Actinomycetota.

== Phylogeny ==
The currently accepted taxonomy is based on the List of Prokaryotic names with Standing in Nomenclature (LPSN) and National Center for Biotechnology Information (NCBI).

Nouioui et al. 2018

- - Eggerthellales
    Eggerthellaceae
  - Coriobacteriales
    - Coriobacteriaceae
    - Atopobiaceae

16S rRNA based LTP_10_2024

- Coriobacteriales
  - Eggerthellaceae~
  - - Atopobiaceae
    - - Eggerthellaceae~
      - - - Slackia
          - Coriobacteriaceae
        - Eggerthellaceae

120 marker proteins based GTDB 10-RS226

- Coriobacteriales
  - Eggerthellaceae
  - - Coriobacteriaceae
    - Atopobiaceae [Kribbibacteriaceae]
