= Eggerthellaceae =

Scientific classification
- Domain: Bacteria
- Kingdom: Bacillati
- Phylum: Actinomycetota
- Class: Coriobacteriia
- Order: Eggerthellales; Gupta et al. 2013
- Family: Eggerthellaceae; Gupta et al. 2013

Genera
- See text

Family of bacteria

The Eggerthellaceae are a family of Gram-positive, rod- or coccus-shaped Actinomycetota. It is the sole family within the order Eggerthellales.

The name Eggerthellaceae is derived from the Latin term Eggerthella, referring to the type genus of the family and the suffix "-ceae," an ending used to denote a family. Together, Eggerthellaceae refers to a family whose nomenclatural type is the genus Eggerthella.

== Biochemical characteristics and molecular signatures ==
Members of this family are mostly anaerobic, non-motile (with the exception of some Gordonibacter and Senegalimassilia species that exhibit motility), asaccharolytic and do not form spores. Eggerthellaceae species are commonly isolated from human and animal faeces and other human sources such as the colon, vagina, oral cavity and blood. Some species have also been isolated from human samples of periodontal or endodontic infections, Crohn's disease and severe bacteremia. The G+C content for Eggerthellaceae species is between 43.4 and 66.3 mol%.

Analysis of genome sequences identified 13 conserved signature indels (CSIs) in diverse proteins that are exclusively present in different Eggerthellaceae species. The proteins containing these CSIs are: excinuclease ABC subunit UvrC, DNA polymerase III subunit alpha, ribonuclease III, tRNA (N6-isopentenyl adenosine(37)-C2)-methylthiotransferase (MiaB), peptide chain release factor 2, 16S rRNA (cytosine(1402)-N(4))-methyltransferase, elongation factor Tu, UDP-N-acetylglucosamine 1-carboxyvinyltransferase DNA polymerase III subunit epsilon, UDP-glucose 4-epimerase and DNA-directed RNA polymerase subunit alpha. The identified CSIs provide reliable and important means to distinguish members of Eggerthellaceae from all other Coriobacteriia as well as other bacteria.

== Phylogeny ==
The currently accepted taxonomy is based on the List of Prokaryotic names with Standing in Nomenclature (LPSN) and National Center for Biotechnology Information (NCBI).

Nouioui et al. 2018 (Note: Asaccharobacter, Ellagibacter, Enteroscipio, Paraeggerthella, and Rubneribacter are not included in this phylogenetic tree.)

- - Coriobacteriales
  - - Eggerthellales
      - Slackia
      - - - Cryptobacterium
          - Denitrobacterium
        - - - Senegalimassilia
            - - Eggerthella
              - Gordonibacter
          - Adlercreutzia

conserved signature indels by Gupta & Carro 2021

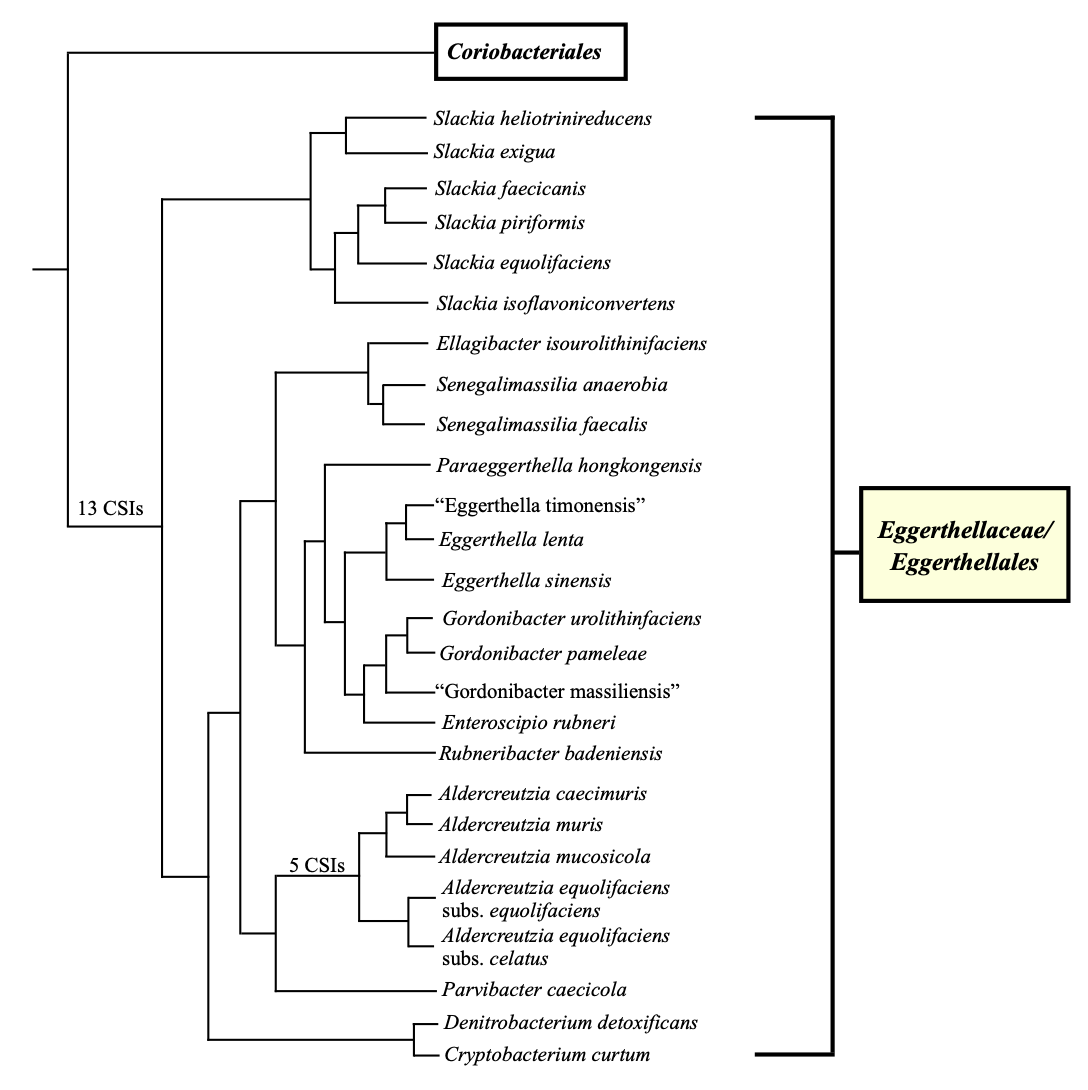

"

16S rRNA based LTP_10_2024

- - - Eggerthellaceae~
      - Anaerotardibacter
      - Raoultibacter
  - - Atopobiaceae
    - - - Eggerthellaceae~
          - Cryptobacterium
          - - Curtanaerobium
            - Denitrobacterium
      - - - Slackia
          - Coriobacteriaceae
        - - Eggerthellaceae
            - - Ellagibacter
              - Senegalimassilia
            - - - Berryella
                - Adlercreutzia [incl. Parvibacter]
              - - - Rubneribacter
                  - Xiamenia
                - - - Adlercreutzia agrestimuris Afrizal et al. 2023
                    - Enteroscipio
                  - - Arabiibacter
                    - - Paraeggerthella
                      - - Gordonibacter
                        - Eggerthella

120 marker proteins based GTDB 10-RS226

- - - Eggerthellaceae
      - "Phoenicibacter" Bilen et al. 2019
      - - Berryella Wylensek et al. 2021
        - - - - "Ca. Aveggerthella" Gilroy et al. 2021
              - Raoultibacter Traore et al. 2022
            - - Slackia Wade et al. 1999
              - - Anaerotardibacter Afrizal et al. 2024
                - - - Cryptobacterium Nakazawa et al. 1999
                    - "Hugonella" Elsawi et al. 2017
                  - - Curtanaerobium Sun et al. 2023
                    - Denitrobacterium Anderson et al. 2000
          - - - Ellagibacter Beltran et al. 2018
              - Senegalimassilia corrig. Lagier et al. 2014
            - - - "Ca. Aphodovivens" Gilroy et al. 2021
                - - - "Adlercreutzia murintestinalis" Afrizal et al. 2022
                    - Parvibacter Clavel et al. 2013
                  - Adlercreutzia Maruo et al. 2008
              - - Xiamenia Zhang et al. 2022
                - - Gordonibacter Wurdemann et al. 2009
                  - - Enteroscipio Danylec et al. 2018
                    - - - Arabiibacter Lo et al. 2023
                        - Rubneribacter Danylec et al. 2018
                      - - Paraeggerthella Wurdemann et al. 2009
                        - Eggerthella Wade et al. 1999
  - - Coriobacteriaceae
    - Atopobiaceae

Genera incertae sedis:

- "Allenteromonas" Liu et al. 2020
- "Mucirhabdus" Liu et al. 2020
- "Stereobacter" Liu et al. 2020
- "Stereobacterium" Liu et al. 2020
- Umbribacter Srinivasan et al. 2025
