= Coriobacteriia =

Scientific classification
- Domain: Bacteria
- Kingdom: Bacillati
- Phylum: Actinomycetota
- Class: Coriobacteriia; König 2013

Orders
- Anaerosomatales; Coriobacteriales

Synonyms
- Coriobacteriidae corrig. Stackebrandt, Rainey & Ward-Rainey 1997

Class of bacteria

The Coriobacteriia are a class of Gram-positive bacteria within the Actinomycetota phylum. Species within this group are nonsporulating, strict or facultative anaerobes that are capable of thriving in a diverse set of ecological niches. Gordonibacter species are the only members capable of motility by means of flagella within the class. Several species within the Coriobacteriia class have been implicated with human diseases that range in severity. Atopobium, Olsenella, and Cryptobacterium species have responsible for human oral infections including periodontitis, halitosis, and other endodontic infections. Eggerthella species have been associated with severe blood bacteraemia and ulcerative colitis.

== Molecular signatures and phylogenetic position ==
Historically, all Coriobacteriia species were placed within a single order (Coriobacteriales) and a single family (Coriobacteriaceae). This view, however, was not reflective of accurate evolutionary interrelationships within the class. The current taxonomic view is justified by the presence of several conserved signature indels (CSIs) that have been found at the different taxonomic ranks. These CSIs are specific and represent synapomorphic characteristics that can be used to distinguish groups within the Coriobacteriia, both at the family and order levels. The distinction of the orders within the Coriobacteriia is also supported phylogenetic tree branching and by consistent characteristics; members belonging to the Coriobacteriales are glucose-fermenting, saccharolytic species while the Eggerthellales order has species that are consistently unable to ferment glucose and are asaccharolytic.

CSIs have also been used to resolve the phylogenetic position of the Coriobacteriia among all bacteria where they have been found exclusively for all species within the class, delineating them from other Actinomycetota. The Coriobacteriia are an early branching lineage within the Actinomycetota phylum. The deep branching of the class has led to dispute over its membership within the phylum and whether or not it is a true Actinomycetota group. A CSI in the form of a single amino acid insert in the enzyme deoxyuridine 59-triphosphate (dUTP) nucleotidohydrolase has been found that is shared by all Coriobacteriia members, as well as several Actinomycetota species, and absent from all other bacteria. This CSI provides unambiguous support for Coriobacteriia's membership within the Actinomycetota.

== Phylogeny ==
The currently accepted taxonomy is based on the List of Prokaryotic names with Standing in Nomenclature (LPSN) and National Center for Biotechnology Information (NCBI).

16S rRNA based LTP_10_2024

- Coriobacteriia
  - Anaerosomatales
    Anaerosomataceae
  - Coriobacteriales
    - Eggerthellaceae~
    - - Atopobiaceae
      - - Eggerthellaceae~
        - - - Slackia
            - Coriobacteriaceae
          - Eggerthellaceae

120 marker proteins based GTDB 10-RS226

- Coriobacteriia
  - Anaerosomatales
    Anaerosomataceae
  - Coriobacteriales
    - Eggerthellaceae
    - - Coriobacteriaceae
      - Atopobiaceae
