= Anaerococcus =

Scientific classification
- Domain: Bacteria
- Kingdom: Bacillati
- Phylum: Bacillota
- Class: Clostridia
- Order: Tissierellales
- Family: Peptoniphilaceae
- Genus: Anaerococcus; Ezaki et al. 2001

Type species
- Anaerococcus prevotii (Foubert & Douglas 1948) Ezaki et al. 2001

Species
- Anaerococcus degeneri Veloo et al. 2017; Anaerococcus hydrogenalis (Ezaki et al. 1990) Ezaki et al. 2001; Anaerococcus lactolyticus (Li et al. 1992) Ezaki et al. 2001; Anaerococcus murdochii Song et al. 2010; Anaerococcus nagyae Veloo et al. 2017; Anaerococcus octavius (Murdoch et al. 1997) Ezaki et al. 2001; Anaerococcus pacaensis Pagnier et al. 2017; Anaerococcus porci Wylensek et al. 2021; Anaerococcus prevotii (Foubert and Douglas 1948) Ezaki et al. 2001; Anaerococcus provencensis Pagnier et al. 2017; Anaerococcus rubeinfantis Tidjani Alou et al. 2017; Anaerococcus senegalensis Lagier et al. 2014; Anaerococcus tetradius (Ezaki et al. 1983) Ezaki et al. 2001; Anaerococcus vaginalis (Li et al. 1992) Ezaki et al. 2001

Genus of bacteria

Anaerococcus is a genus of gram-positive bacteria. Its type species is Anaerococcus prevotii. These bacteria are Gram-positive and strictly anaerobic. The genus Anaerococcus was proposed in 2001. Its genome was sequenced in August 2009. The genus Anaerococcus is one of six genera classified within the group GPAC (Gram-Positive Anaerobic Cocci). These six genera (Peptostreptococcus, Peptoniphilus, Parvimonas, Finegoldia, Murdochiella, and Anaerococcus) are found in the human body as part of the commensal human microbiota.

It is commonly found in the human microbiome and is associated with various infections. Most of the species in this genus can be found among microbes of the skin, human vagina, nasal cavity, oral cavity and feces, often as a pathogen found in ovarian abscesses, chronic wounds and vaginal discharge. Moreover, some of the species can be isolated from foot ulcers and knee arthritis. It can be present in urinary tract infections, chronic ulcers, pleural empyema, blood infections, and soft tissue infections. It is involved in polymicrobial infections. Strains of Anaerococcus were found in the armpit microbiota, suggesting some species in this genus could play a role in axillary odor.

== Physiology ==
The genus Anaerococcus are nonmotile bacteria who cannot form spores. Depending on the species, the arrangement can be different. The most common arrangements within this genus are pairs, tetrads, short chains and irregular formations. Their cells size can differ from 0.6μm to 0.9μm. However, when they are grown using enrinched blood agar their size can go from 0.5μm to 2μm. In this genus, there are more than one major cellular fatty acids: C18:1, C16:1, C18 and C16. Most species in this genus are indole-negative and coaguase-negative. In general, the species of Anaerococcus presents susceptibility to penicillins but are resistant to tetracycline, erythromycin and clindamycin.

== Metabolism ==
The genus Anaerococcus are classified as saccharolytic bacteria. Its species can be arranged from weakly saccharolytic (ex. A. prevotii, A. lactolyticus) to strongly saccharolytic (ex. A. hydrogenalis). This genus can ferment carbohydrates weakly. The major sources of energy use in the metabolism of Anaerococcus are peptones and aminoacids. The three major sugars fermented within this genus are glucose, mannose, fructose and sucrose. After fermenting the sugars, Anaerococcus produce weak acids as their metabolic end product. Within these metabolic end products, this genus ca produce butyric acid, lactic acid, and some propionic and succinic acid. Nonetheless, the major metabolite produced by Anaerococcus is butyrate.

== Phylogeny ==
The currently accepted taxonomy is based on the List of Prokaryotic names with Standing in Nomenclature (LPSN) and the National Center for Biotechnology Information (NCBI)

16S rRNA based LTP_10_2024

- Anaerococcus
  - - A. porci
    - - A. vaginalis
      - - A. rubeinfantis
        - - A. jeddahensis
          - - A. hydrogenalis
            - A. senegalensis
  - - - A. pacaensis
      - - A. nagyae
        - A. octavius
    - - - A. prevotii
        - A. tetradius
      - - A. lactolyticus
        - - A. degeneri
          - A. murdochii

120 marker proteins based GTDB 09-RS220

- Anaerococcus
  - - A. porci Wylensek et al. 2021
    - - - A. hydrogenalis (Ezaki et al. 1990) Ezaki et al. 2001
        - A. senegalensis Lagier et al. 2014
      - - A. vaginalis (Li et al. 1992) Ezaki et al. 2001
        - - A. jeddahensis Dione et al. 2023
          - - "A. ihuae" Ly et al. 2022
            - A. rubeinfantis corrig. Tidjani Alou et al. 2017
  - - - - A. provencensis corrig. Pagnier et al. 2017
        - "A. urinimassiliensis" corrig. Morand et al. 2016
      - - A. pacaensis Pagnier et al. 2017
        - - A. nagyae Veloo et al. 2017
          - A. octavius (Murdoch et al. 1997) Ezaki et al. 2001
    - - - "A. vaginimassiliensis" Bordigoni et al. 2020
        - - A. tetradius (Ezaki et al. 1983) Ezaki et al. 2001
          - - "A. marasmi" Tall et al. 2020
            - A. prevotii (Foubert and Douglas 1948) Ezaki et al. 2001
      - - "A. mediterraneensis" Diop et al. 2017
        - - A. lactolyticus (Li et al. 1992) Ezaki et al. 2001
          - - A. degeneri Veloo et al. 2017
            - A. murdochii Song et al. 2010

Incertae sedis:

- "A. faecalis" Yu et al. 2021
- "Ca. A. massiliensis" Fenollar et al. 2006
- "Ca. A. phoceensis" Fenollar et al. 2006
- "Ca. A. timonensis" Fenollar et al. 2006

== Species ==
Until recently, the genus Anaerococcus had 14 known species. Six of the species were initially classified in the genus Peptostreptococcus but then, based on their characteristics were re-classified in the new genus Anaerococcus: A. hydrogenalis, A. lactolyticus, A. octavius, A. prevotii, A. tetradius, and A. vaginalis. Throughout the years, the species that has been more commonly found on the body within this genus is A. prevotii.

=== Anaerococcus octavius ===
Contrary to most of the species in the genus, Anaerococcus octavius was not related to human infections. Nevertheless, recently a new case revealed A. octavius can cause bacteremia. Even though it is uncommon, Anaerococcus octavius can be the cause for human infections. Other studies have found A. octavius as part of the nasal, skin, and vaginal normal flora. This bacteria can ferment ribose, glucose, and mannose.

=== Anaerococcus prevotii ===
A. prevotii is normally found in vaginal discharge, human plasma and some types of abscesses - such as ovarian, peritoneal, sacral, and/or lung abscesses. Anaerococcus prevotii is part of the normal flora in the skin, oral cavity, and gut. Studies have shown Anaerococcus prevotii presents resistance to Ceftazidime, Clindamycin, Levofloxacin. Unlike the other species, A. prevotii can not ferment glucose.

=== Anaerococcus vaginalis ===
A. vaginalis was first recovered from vaginal discharges and ovarian abscesses although this bacteria can also be found in pressure ulcers and diabetic foot. Some strains from this species can be indole-positive.

=== Anaerococcus provencensis ===
A. provencensis was isolated from a cervical abscess. This species can ferment lactose, unlike A. tetradius, A. prevotii, and A. octavius. The first analysis made on Anaerococcus provencensis showed it is susceptible to penicillin G, imipenem, amoxillin, metronidazole, cefotetan and vancomycin.

=== Anaerococcus senegalensis ===
A. senegalensis is one of the few species in the genus whose genome has been sequenced. The genome has a size of 1,790,835 bp. Analysis did not show the presence of a plasmid. Initially, Anaerococcus senegalensis was found in the fecal flora of a healthy person.

=== Anaerococcus rubiinfantis ===
A. rubiinfantis was discovered from a stool sample taken from an infant with severe acute malnutrition in Senegal. Based on a genomic analysis, Anaerococcus rubiinfantis has high antibiotic susceptibility. For that reason this bacteria can be treated with common oral antibiotics. A. rubiinfantis have catalase activity, which is not common for an anaerobic bacteria.

=== Anaerococcus marasmi ===
A. marasmi was first found in 2016 from a stool sample on a child with marasmus. Just like A. rubiinfantis, Anaerococcus marasmi is catalase positive. A. marasmi can grow in a range of pH between 6.5 and 8. Moreover, A. marasmi has a high 16S rRNA sequence similarity (97.6%) with A. prevotii

=== Anaerococcus urinomassiliensis ===
A. urinomassiliensis was isolated from a urine sample of a male adolescent with membranoproliferative glomerulonephritis and autoimmune hepatitis. It took 10 days of anaerobic incubation to observe growth from this bacteria. Anaerococcus urinomassiliensis does not have either oxidase or catalase activity.

== See also ==
- List of bacterial orders
- List of bacteria genera
