= Tubo-ovarian abscess =

One of the late complications of pelvic inflammatory disease

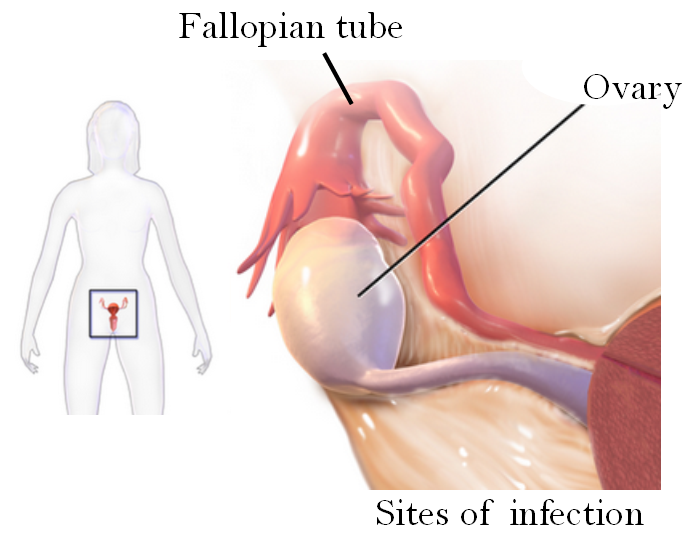
- Drawing showing the sites of a tubo-ovarian abscess
- Specialty: Urology, gynaecology

A tubo-ovarian abscess (TOA) is one of the late complications of pelvic inflammatory disease (PID) and can be life-threatening if the abscess ruptures and results in sepsis. It consists of an encapsulated or confined pocket of pus with defined boundaries that forms during an infection of a fallopian tube and ovary. These abscesses are found most commonly in reproductive age women and typically result from upper genital tract infection. It is an inflammatory mass involving the fallopian tube, ovary and, occasionally, other adjacent pelvic organs. A TOA can also develop as a complication of a hysterectomy.

Symptoms typically include fever, an elevated white blood cell count, lower abdominal-pelvic pain, and/or vaginal discharge. Fever and leukocytosis may be absent. TOAs are often polymicrobial with a high percentage of anaerobic bacteria. The cost of treatment in the United States is approximately $2,000 per patient, which equals about $1.5 billion annually. Though rare, TOA can occur without a preceding episode of PID or sexual activity.

== Signs and symptoms ==
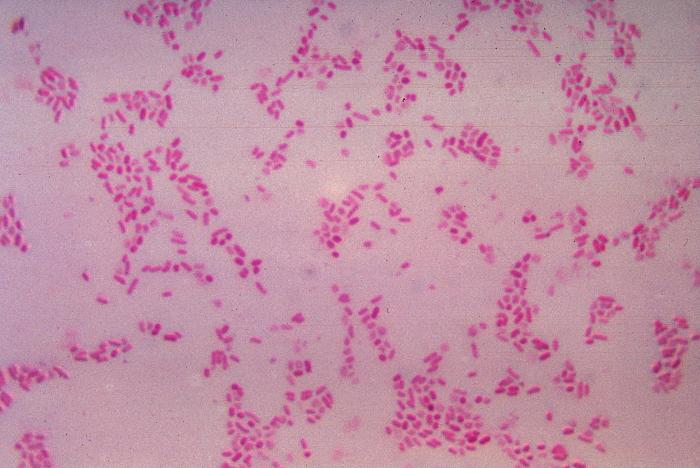
Bacteroides fragilis

The signs and symptoms of tubo-ovarian abscess (TOA) are the same as with pelvic inflammatory disease (PID) with the exception that the abscess can be found with magnetic resonance imaging (MRI), sonography and x-ray. It also differs from PID in that it can create symptoms of acute-onset pelvic pain. Typically this disease is found in sexually active women. Tubo-ovarian abscess can mimic abdominal tumours.

=== Complications ===
Complications of TOA are related to the possible removal of one or both ovaries and fallopian tubes. Without these reproductive structures, fertility can be affected. Surgical complications can develop and include:

- Allergic shock due to anesthetics
- A paradoxical reaction to a drug
- Infection

== Cause ==
The development of TOA is thought to begin with the pathogens spreading from the cervix to the endometrium, through the salpinx, into the peritoneal cavity and forming the tubo-ovarian abscess with (in some cases) pelvic peritonitis. TOA can develop from the lymphatic system with infection of the parametrium from an intrauterine device (IUD). Bacteria recovered from TOAs are Escherichia coli, Bacteroides fragilis, other Bacteroides species, Peptostreptococcus, Peptococcus, and aerobic streptococci. Long term IUD use is associated with TOA. Actinomyces is also recovered from TOA.

| Genus | species | Gram stain | form | genome sequenced | reference |
|---|---|---|---|---|---|
| Neisseria gonorrhoeae | spp. | – | cocci | | |
| Chlamydia trachomatis | spp. | – | intracellular | | |
| Mycoplasma genitalium | spp. | + | bacillus | | |
| Mycoplasma hominis | | | | | |
| Ureaplasma urealyticum | | + | bacillus | | |
| Escherichia coli | | – | bacillus | X | |
| Corynebacterium jeikeium | | + | bacillus | X | |
| Bacteroides fragilis | | + | bacillus | X | |
| Lactobacillus | jensenii | + | bacillus | | |
| Cutibacterium acnes | | + | bacillus | | |
| Haemophilus influenzae | | + | bacillus | | |
| Streptococcus pneumoniae | | + | cocci | | |
| Streptococcus constellatus | | + | cocci | | |
| Prevotella bivia | | – | bacillus | | |
| Fusobacterium nucleatum | | + | bacillus | | |
| Enterococcus faecium | | + | cocci | | |
| Actinomyces neuii | | + | bacillus | X | |
| Lactobacillus | delbrueckii | + | bacillus | | |
| Streptococcus intermedius | | + | cocci | | |
| Eikenella corrodens | | + | bacillus | X | |
| Abiotrophia | | + | bacillus | X | |
| Granulicatella | | + | bacillus | X | |

== Diagnosis ==
Laparoscopy and other imaging tools can visualize the abscess. Physicians are able to make the diagnosis if the abscess ruptures when the woman begins to have lower abdominal pain that then begins to spread. The symptoms then become the same as the symptoms for peritonitis. Sepsis occurs, if left untreated. Ultrasonography is a sensitive enough imaging tool that it can accurately differentiate between pregnancy, hemorrhagic ovarian cysts, endometriosis, ovarian torsion, and tubo-ovarian abscess. Its availability, the relative advancement in the training of its use, its low cost, and because it does not expose the woman (or fetus) to ionizing radiation, ultrasonography an ideal imaging procedure for women of reproductive age.

== Prevention ==
Risk factors have been identified which indicate what women will be more likely to develop TOA. These are: increased age, IUD insertion, chlamydia infection, and increased levels of certain proteins (CRP and CA-125) and will alert clinicians to follow up on unresolved symptoms of PID.

== Treatment ==
Treatment for TOA differs from PID in that some clinicians recommend patients with tubo-ovarian abscesses have at least 24 hours of inpatient parenteral treatment with antibiotics, and that they may require surgery. If surgery becomes necessary, pre-operative administration of broad-spectrum antibiotics is started and removal of the abscess, the affected ovary and fallopian tube is done. After discharge from the hospital, oral antibiotics are continued for the length of time prescribed by the physician.

Treatment is different if the TOA is discovered before it ruptures and can be treated with IV antibiotics. During this treatment, IV antibiotics are usually replaced with oral antibiotics on an outpatient basis. Patients are usually seen three days after hospital discharge and then again one to two weeks later to confirm that the infection has cleared. Ampicillin/sulbactam plus doxycycline is effective against C. trachomatis, N. gonorrhoeae, and anaerobes in women with tubo-ovarian abscess. Parenteral Regimens described by the Centers for Disease Control and prevention are Ampicillin/Sulbactam 3 g IV every 6 hours and Doxycycline 200 mg orally or IV every 24 hours, though other regiments that are used for pelvic inflammatory disease have been effective.

== Epidemiology ==
The epidemiology of TOA is closely related to that of pelvic inflammatory disease which is estimated to one million people yearly.
