= Lung abscess =

Accumulation of pus in the lungs

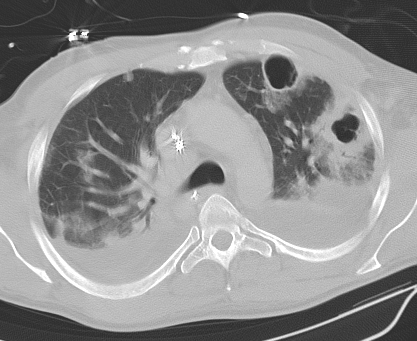
- Computed tomography (CT) scan of chest showing bilateral pneumonia with abscesses, effusions, and caverns. 37-year-old male.
- Specialty: Infectious disease, respirology

Lung abscess is a type of liquefactive necrosis of the lung tissue and formation of cavities (more than 2 cm) containing necrotic debris or fluid caused by microbial infection.

This pus-filled cavity is often caused by aspiration, which may occur during anesthesia, sedation, or unconsciousness from injury. Alcoholism is the most common condition predisposing to lung abscesses.

Lung abscess is considered primary (60%) when it results from existing lung parenchymal process and is termed secondary when it complicates another process e.g. vascular emboli or follows rupture of extrapulmonary abscess into lung.

== Signs and symptoms ==
Onset of symptoms is often gradual, but in necrotizing staphylococcal or gram-negative bacillary pneumonias patients can be acutely ill. Cough, fever with shivering, and night sweats are often present. Cough can be productive of foul-smelling, purulent mucus (≈70%) or less frequently with blood in one-third of cases. Affected individuals may also complain of chest pain, shortness of breath, lethargy, and other features of chronic illness.

Those with a lung abscess are generally cachectic at presentation. Finger clubbing is present in one third of patients. Dental decay is common especially in alcoholics and children. On examination of the chest there will be features of consolidation such as localized dullness on percussion and bronchial breath sounds.

=== Complications ===
Although rare in modern times, can include spread of infection to other lung segments, bronchiectasis, empyema, and bacteremia with metastatic infection such as brain abscess. Other complications from under-recognition, under-treatment, and untreated underlying causes include rupture into pleural space, pleural fibrosis, trapped lung, respiratory failure, bronchopleural fistula, and pleurocutaneous fistula. In modern times, complications occur rarely due to the underrecognition or inappropriate treatment of the underlying cause of the lung abscess.

== Causes ==
=== Conditions contributing to lung abscess ===
- Aspiration of oropharyngeal or gastric secretion
- Septic emboli
- Necrotizing pneumonia
- Vasculitis: Granulomatosis with polyangiitis
- Necrotizing tumors: 8% to 18% are due to neoplasms across all age groups, higher in older people; primary squamous carcinoma of the lung is the most common.

=== Organisms ===
In the post-antibiotic era pattern of frequency is changing. In older studies anaerobes were found in up to 90% cases but they are much less frequent now.

- Anaerobic bacteria: Actinomyces, Peptostreptococcus, Bacteroides, Fusobacterium, Parvimonas micra species,Microaerophilic streptococcus: Streptococcus milleri
- Aerobic bacteria: Staphylococcus, Klebsiella, Haemophilus, Pseudomonas, Nocardia, Escherichia coli, Streptococcus, Mycobacterium
- Fungi: Candida, Aspergillus, Histoplasma, Blastomyces, and Coccidioides
- Parasites: Entamoeba histolytica, Paragonimus

== Diagnosis ==
=== Imaging studies ===
Lung abscesses are often on one side and single involving posterior segments of the upper lobes and the apical segments of the lower lobes as these areas are gravity dependent when lying down. Presence of air-fluid levels implies rupture into the bronchial tree or rarely growth of gas forming organism.

=== Laboratory studies ===
Raised inflammatory markers (high ESR, CRP) are common but nonspecific. Examination of the coughed-up mucus is important in any lung infection and often reveals mixed bacterial flora. Transtracheal or transbronchial (via bronchoscopy) aspirates can also be cultured. Fiber optic bronchoscopy is often performed to exclude obstructive lesion; it also helps in bronchial drainage of pus.

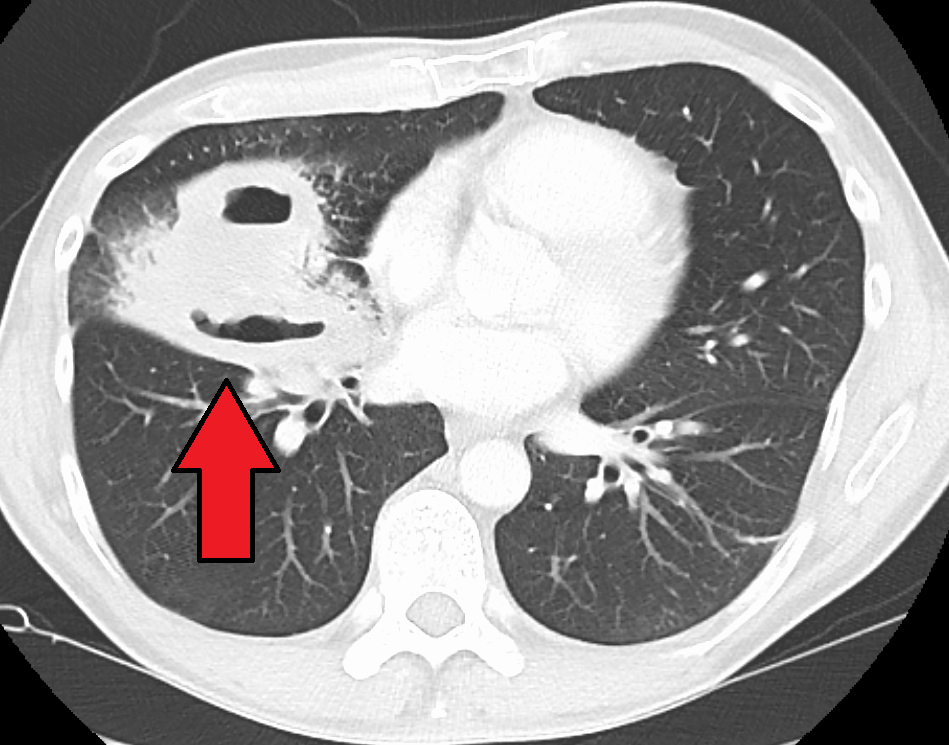
Pulmonary abscess on CT scan

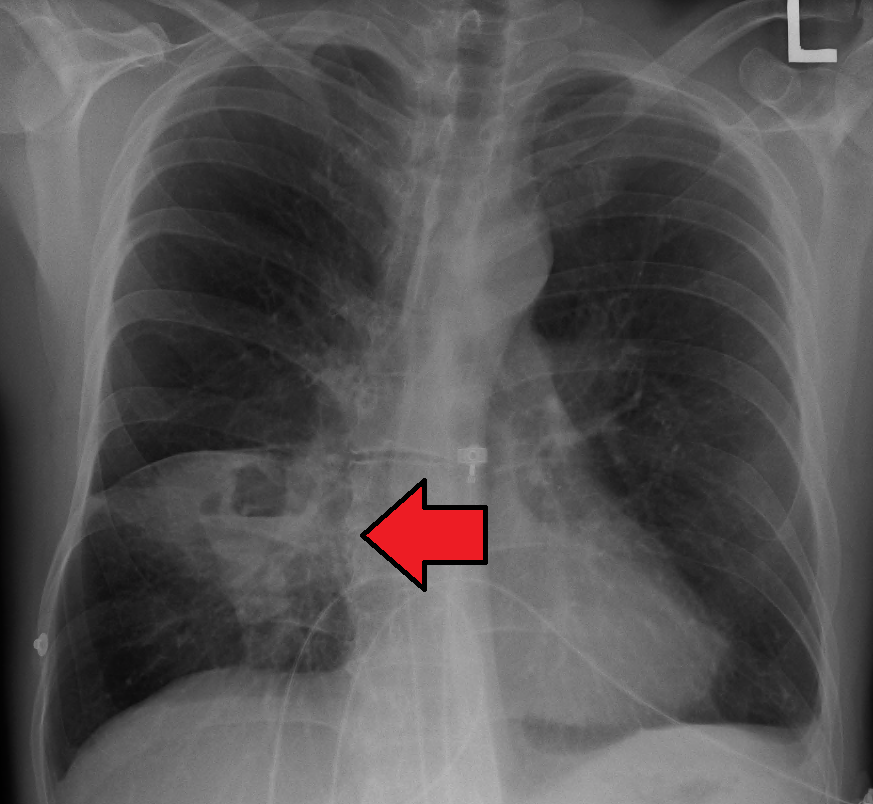
Pulmonary abscess on a chest X-ray

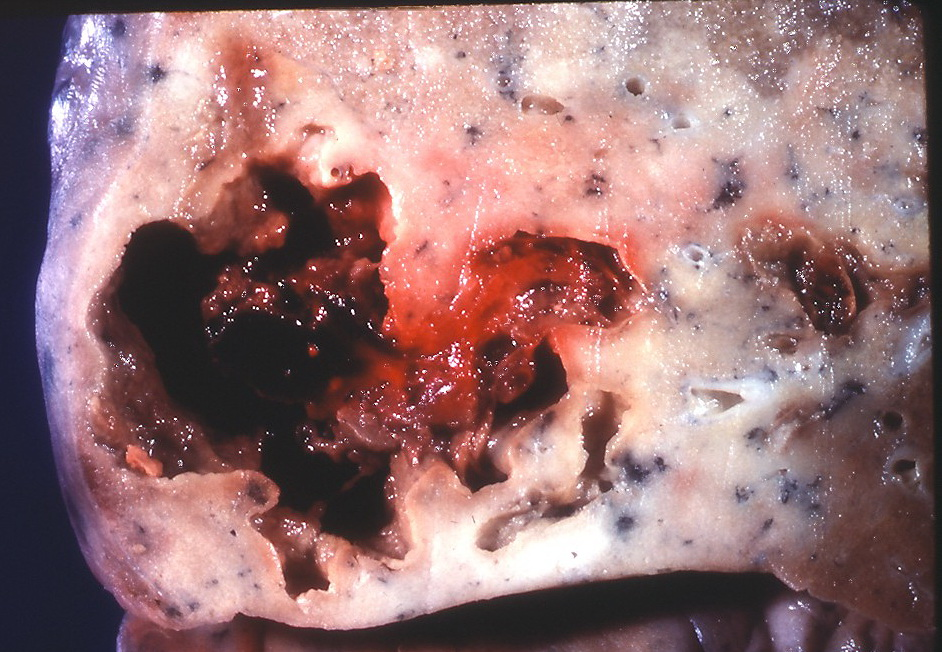
Pathology image of a lung abscess.

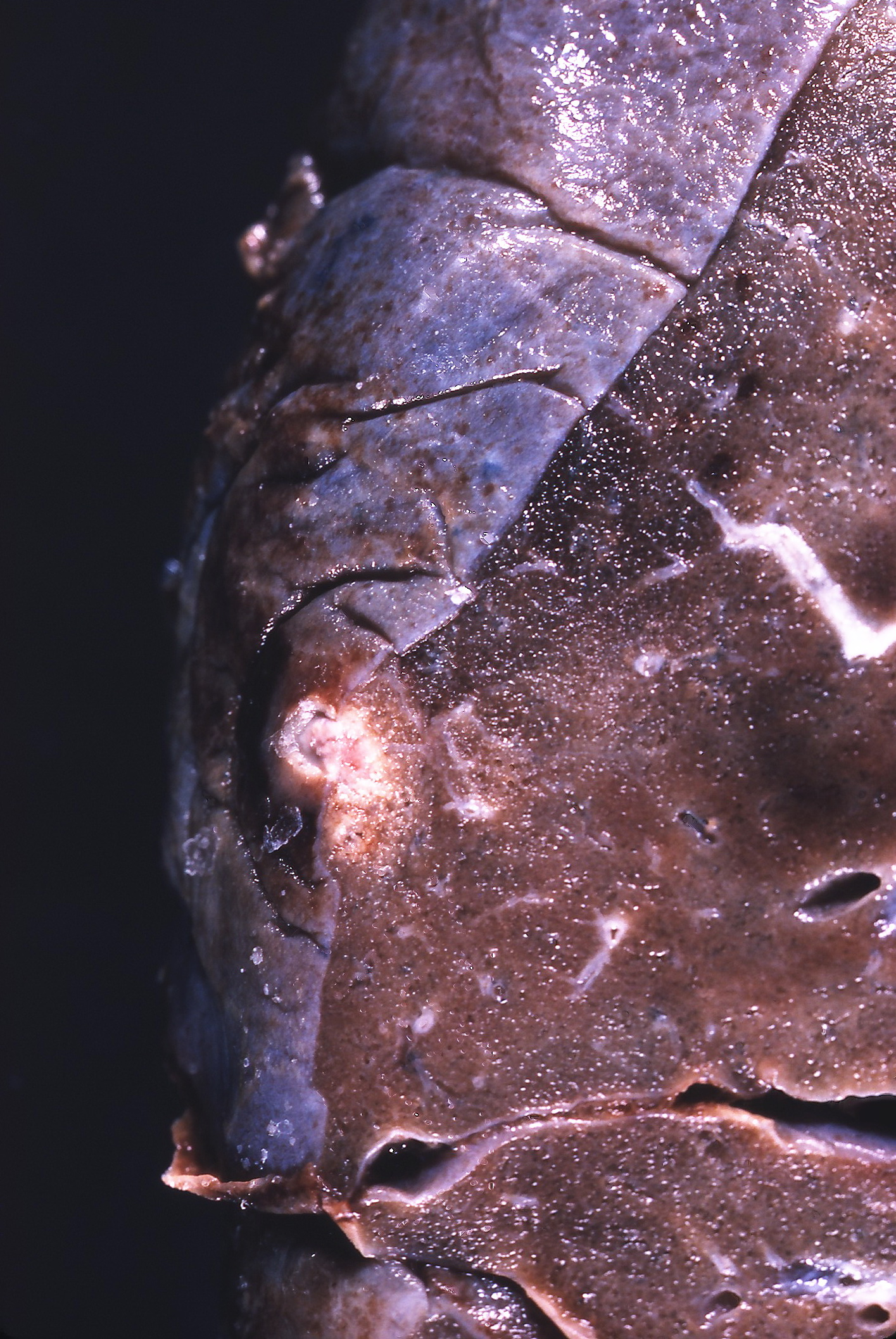
A subpleural abscess.

== Management ==
Broad spectrum antibiotic to cover mixed flora is the mainstay of treatment. Pulmonary physiotherapy and postural drainage are also important. Surgical procedures are required in selective patients for drainage or pulmonary resection.

The treatment is divided according to the type of abscess, acute or chronic. For acute cases the treatment is

- antibiotics:
  - if anaerobic: metronidazole or clindamycin
  - if aerobic: beta-lactams, cephalosporins
  - if MRSA or Staphylococcus infection: vancomycin or linezolid
- postural drainage and chest physiotherapy
- bronchoscopy is used for the following cases:
  - aspiration or instillation of antibiotics
  - patients with atypical presentation suspected of having underlying foreign body or malignancy

== Prognosis ==
Most cases respond to antibiotics and prognosis is usually excellent unless there is a debilitating underlying condition. Mortality from lung abscess alone is around 5% and is improving.

== See also ==
- Empyema
- Bronchiectasis
- Abscess
- Pleural effusion
