= Peptostreptococcus stomatis =

Scientific classification
- Domain: Bacteria
- Kingdom: Bacillati
- Phylum: Bacillota
- Class: Clostridia
- Order: Peptostreptococcales
- Family: Peptostreptococcaceae
- Genus: Peptostreptococcus
- Species: P. stomatis

Binomial name
- Peptostreptococcus stomatis Downes and Wade 2006

Species of bacterium

Peptostreptococcus stomatis is a bacterium from the family Peptostreptococcaceae. It is a commensal bacterium and was first isolated from the human oral cavity in 2006, however it can also invade other areas of the body and cause infection, particularly in those with weakened immune systems.

== History and entomology ==
P. stomatis was discovered on 1 April 2006 by Julia Downes and William G. Wade. The name P. stomatis was proposed as the origin of the samples came from the human oral cavity.

== Biology and ecology ==
P. stomatis cells are gram-positive and cocci in shape. They are catalase-negative as they do not have the enzyme catalase, which protects catalase-positive bacteria from hydrogen peroxide by converting it into hydrogen and oxygen. P. stomatis cells are 0.8 × 0.8 – 0.9 μm, and are arranged in pairs and short chains. P. stomatis colonies are circular and 0.8 – 1.8 mm in diameter. P. stomatis cells are anaerobic and non-spore forming. They are normally found in the oral cavity as part of the oral microbiome, although this bacterium has been found alive in mouse stools, which shows that it can also survive the harsh conditions within the gastrointestinal tract.

P. stomatis produces acetic, butyric, isobutyric, isovaleric and isocaproic acids from fermentation. It is weakly saccharolytic, and can weakly ferment fructose, glucose and maltose. It grows moderately in broth media, and growth can be improved by adding fermentable carbohydrates.

== Diseases caused ==
P. stomatis is pro-tumorigenic and promotes the development of colorectal cancer. Also, this bacterium can contribute to deep-seated infections. It is able to form pus and can invade various areas of the body to cause severe infections, particularly in the immunocompromised. However, P. stomatis and Parvimonas micra have also caused a rapidly progressive pulmonary abscess in an immunocompetent patient. P. stomatis can cause infections of the oral cavity, such as chronic apical peridontis, dento-alveolar abscesses, and endodontic infections.

== Symptoms ==
Little research has been conducted on P. stomatis. The bacterium samples have been overrepresented in samples from patients with colorectal cancer. Models have linked it to an acceleration in colorectal cancer due to limiting the effectiveness of RTK inhibitors, however a causal link has yet to be established.
