= Peptoniphilus coxii =

Scientific classification
- Domain: Bacteria
- Kingdom: Bacillati
- Phylum: Bacillota
- Class: Clostridia
- Order: Tissierellales
- Family: Peptoniphilaceae
- Genus: Peptoniphilus
- Species: P. coxii

Binomial name
- Peptoniphilus coxii Citron et al. 2013

Type strain
- ATCC BAA-2106, CCUG 59622, JCM 16892, RMA 16757

Species of bacterium

Peptoniphilus coxii is a bacterium from the genus Peptoniphilus which has been isolated from human infections.
