= Peptoniphilus stercorisuis =

Scientific classification
- Domain: Bacteria
- Kingdom: Bacillati
- Phylum: Bacillota
- Class: Clostridia
- Order: Tissierellales
- Family: Peptoniphilaceae
- Genus: Peptoniphilus
- Species: P. stercorisuis

Binomial name
- Peptoniphilus stercorisuis Johnson et al. 2014

Type strain
- DSM 27563, NBRC 109839, strain SF-S1

Synonyms
- Peptoniphilus oklahomii

Species of bacterium

Peptoniphilus stercorisuis is a Gram-positive and anaerobic bacterium from the genus Peptoniphilus which has been isolated from a swine manure storage tank from Oklahoma in the United States.
