= Pyogenic liver abscess =

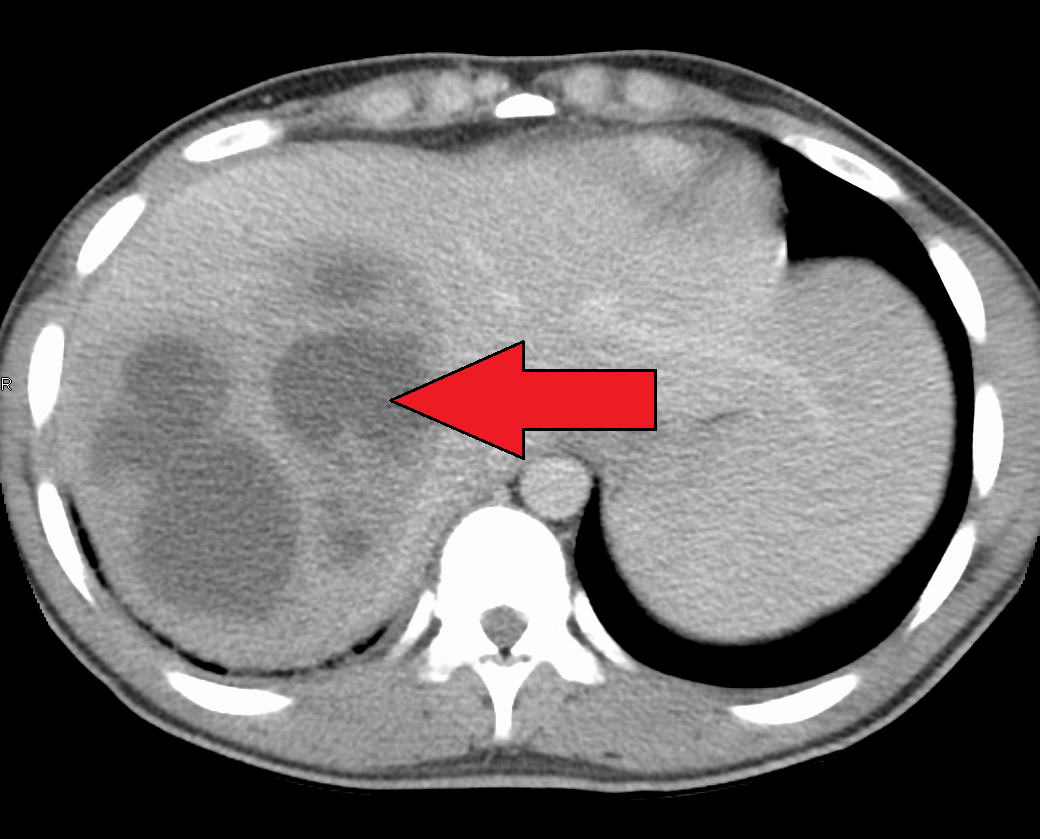
- A large pyogenic liver abscess presumed to be the result of appendicitis
- Specialty: Gastroenterology

A pyogenic liver abscess is a type of liver abscess caused by bacteria. Pyogenic refers to the formation of pus that characterizes these liver abscesses.

== Signs and symptoms ==
=== Acute abscess ===
- Fever
- Lethargy
- Discomfort in right upper quadrant of abdomen
- Anorexia
- Enlarged and tender liver
- Pleural effusion

=== Chronic abscess ===
- Fever
- Abdominal discomfort
- Enlarged liver

== Cause ==
- Biliary disease (most common)

E.g.: stones, cholangiocarcinoma

- Colonic disease

E.g.: diverticulitis, appendicitis, Crohn's disease

- Cryptogenic disease
- Pancreatitis
- Infection of blood
- Intra-abdominal sepsis
- Infection of biliary system
- Traumatic introduction

E.g.: penetrating injury, iatrogenic (radiofrequency ablation)

=== Common bacterial causes ===
- Streptococcus milleri
- E. coli
- Streptococcus fecalis
- Klebsiella pneumoniae
- Proteus vulgaris
- Bacteroides
- Opportunistic pathogens (Staphylococcus)

== Diagnosis ==
To differentiate pyogenic liver abscess from amoebic liver abscess, several features such as subjects with age more than 50 years with lungs involvement, multiple liver abscesses, with amoebic serologic titres less than 1:256 can help to pin down the diagnosis of pyogenic liver abscess.

- Blood CP (no leucocytosis)
- Haemoglobin estimation (anaemia)
- Serum albumin levels (falls rapidly)
- USG and CT scanning
- Guided aspiration to confirm the diagnosis

== Treatment ==
1. Antibiotics
  - Penicillins
  - Aminoglycosides
  - Metronidazole
  - Cephalosporins
2. Percutaneous drainage under USG or CT control
3. Laparotomy in intra-abdominal disease
