= Peptoniphilus gorbachii =

Scientific classification
- Domain: Bacteria
- Kingdom: Bacillati
- Phylum: Bacillota
- Class: Clostridia
- Order: Tissierellales
- Family: Peptoniphilaceae
- Genus: Peptoniphilus
- Species: P. gorbachii

Binomial name
- Peptoniphilus gorbachii Song et al. 2010

Type strain
- ATCC BAA-1383, CCUG 53341, DSM 21461, JCM 15634, WAL 10418

Species of bacterium

Peptoniphilus gorbachii is a Gram-positive and anaerobic bacterium from the genus Peptoniphilus which has been isolated from a human abscess from Los Angeles in the United States.
