= Anaerococcus degeneri =

Scientific classification
- Domain: Bacteria
- Kingdom: Bacillati
- Phylum: Bacillota
- Class: Clostridia
- Order: Tissierellales
- Family: Peptoniphilaceae
- Genus: Anaerococcus
- Species: A. degeneri

Binomial name
- Anaerococcus degeneri Veloo et al. 2017

Synonyms
- Anaerococcus degenerii

Species of bacterium

Anaerococcus degeneri is a bacterium from the family Peptoniphilaceae.
