= Anaerococcus murdochii =

Scientific classification
- Domain: Bacteria
- Kingdom: Bacillati
- Phylum: Bacillota
- Class: Clostridia
- Order: Tissierellales
- Family: Peptoniphilaceae
- Genus: Anaerococcus
- Species: A. murdochii

Binomial name
- Anaerococcus murdochii Song et al. 2010

Synonyms
- Anaerococcus murdochii

Species of bacterium

Anaerococcus murdochii is a bacterium from the family of Peptoniphilaceae. A. murdochii has been reported from skin and wound infections. Resistance or reduced susceptibility to several antibiotics, such as colistin sulphate, clindamycin, and kanamycin A or penicillin has been reported.
