= Peptoniphilus methioninivorax =

Scientific classification
- Domain: Bacteria
- Kingdom: Bacillati
- Phylum: Bacillota
- Class: Clostridia
- Order: Tissierellales
- Family: Peptoniphilaceae
- Genus: Peptoniphilus
- Species: P. methioninivorax

Binomial name
- Peptoniphilus methioninivorax Rooney et al. 2011

Type strain
- DSM 22461, NRRL B-23883

Bacterium

Peptoniphilus methioninivorax is a Gram-positive and strictly anaerobic bacterium from the genus Peptoniphilus which has been isolated from ground beef from Farmington in the United States.
