= Peptoniphilus catoniae =

Scientific classification
- Domain: Bacteria
- Kingdom: Bacillati
- Phylum: Bacillota
- Class: Clostridia
- Order: Tissierellales
- Family: Peptoniphilaceae
- Genus: Peptoniphilus
- Species: P. catoniae

Binomial name
- Peptoniphilus catoniae Patel et al. 2016

Type strain
- CCUG 66798, DSM 29874, M6.X2D

Synonyms
- Peptoniphilus sarcinae

Species of bacterium

Peptoniphilus catoniae is a Gram-positive and obligately anaerobic bacterium from the genus of Peptoniphilus which has been isolated from human feces from the Ica region in Peru.
