= Peptoniphilus timonensis =

Scientific classification
- Domain: Bacteria
- Kingdom: Bacillati
- Phylum: Bacillota
- Class: Clostridia
- Order: Tissierellales
- Family: Peptoniphilaceae
- Genus: Peptoniphilus
- Species: P. timonensis

Binomial name
- Peptoniphilus timonensis Mishra et al. 2015

Type strain
- CSUR P165, DSM 25367, strain JC401

Species of bacterium

Peptoniphilus timonensis is a Gram-positive and anaerobic bacterium from the genus Peptoniphilus which has been isolated from human feces from Dielmo in Senegal.
