= Finegoldia magna =

Scientific classification
- Domain: Bacteria
- Kingdom: Bacillati
- Phylum: Bacillota
- Class: Clostridia
- Order: Tissierellales
- Family: Peptoniphilaceae
- Genus: Finegoldia
- Species: F. magna

Binomial name
- Finegoldia magna (Prévot 1933) Murdoch and Shah 1999

Synonyms
- Peptostreptococcus magnus Diplococcus magnus

Species of bacterium

Finegoldia magna is a species of anaerobic, gram-positive bacteria in the family Peptoniphilaceae. It is the type species of the genus Finegoldia and a common member of the normal microbiota of the gastrointestinal tract, oral cavity, and skin. F. magna is an opportunistic pathogen in humans and can cause a wide range of infections.

== Taxonomy ==
The species was first described as Diplococcus magnus in 1933. It was later transferred to the genus Peptostreptococcus. In 1999, 16S rRNA sequence analysis indicated the species was phylogenetically distinct from other members of Peptostreptococcus, and it was reclassified to the new genus, Finegoldia.

== Phenotypic characteristics ==
=== Morphology and growth characteristics ===
Finegoldia magna cells are gram-positive cocci. They are generally arranged in pairs and clusters and may resemble staphylococcal cells. F. magna cells are larger than most peptostreptococci, measuring greater than 0.6 um in diameter.

F. magna has a relatively slow growth rate in vitro. Colonies on enriched blood agar are 1–2 mm in diameter after 2–5 days. The color of the colonies are usually translucent, but can vary from white to gray to yellow. F. magna is an anaerobe, requiring an oxygen-free environment for optimum growth. F. magna cultures that were exposed to oxygen for 48 hours still retained some viable cells, suggesting that the species may be aerotolerant.

The predominant fermentation product produced by F. magna is acetic acid. Some strains are able to ferment fructose and only a few are able to ferment glucose.

== Virulence ==
Unlike most gram-positive anaerobic cocci (GPAC), Finegoldia magna possesses several well-characterized virulence factors that contribute to colonization, persistence, immune evasion, and tissue damage. The distribution and expression of these proteins vary among strains, contributing to differences in pathogenic potential between isolates.

=== Finegoldia adhesion factor ===
Finegoldia adhesion factor (FAF) is a surface-associated adhesin that mediates attachment to host tissues and promotes bacterial aggregation. FAF mediates attachment by binding to galectin-7, a protein found on keratinocytes. FAF also interacts with collagen and fibrillin, which helps the bacterium to colonize and establish infection in the deeper dermal tissues.

F. magna also releases a considerable amount of FAF and the exogenous FAF may act as a protective barrier for the bacterium during infection.

=== SufA ===
Another important virulence factor produced by F. magna is SufA, a subtilisin-like extracellular serine protease that is secreted by the bacterium. SufA helps the bacterium invade and colonize skin by degrading collagen IV, which is a part of the backbone structure of the basement membrane.

SufA also helps protect F. magna from the innate immune response by degrading LL-37, a human cathelicidin that kills microorganisms.

=== Protein L ===
Protein L is a surface protein expressed by certain strains of F. magna. It binds to the variable domain of the κ immunoglobulin light chains independently of antigen specificity, distinguishing it from Protein A of Staphylococcus aureus and protein G of streptococci which bind the Fc region of immunoglobulins. Protein L shows similar binding affinity to several antibody classes, namely IgG, IgM, and IgA. The superantigen activity of Protein L binding to the light chain of IgG is speculated to play a role in causing toxic shock syndrome.

=== Peptostreptococcal albumin binding protein (PAB) ===
Some strains of F. magna produce a protein called peptostreptococcal albumin binding protein (PAB), that binds to albumin, a protein found in human serum. A study examining F. magna isolates sourced from localized infections found that more than half produced of the strains produced PAB, suggesting the protein may enhance bacterial virulence. Human serum albumin acts as a transporter of many molecules, including long and short-chain fatty acids, tryptophan, and thyroxine.

== Clinical significance ==
Gram-positive anaerobic cocci (GPAC) account for one third of anaerobic bacteria isolated from clinical specimens. Finegoldia magna is widely regarded as the most clinically significant member of the GPAC. Although the species normally exists as a commensal organism, disruption of epithelial barriers or impairment of host immune defenses result in opportunistic infection. Infections are typically endogenous, arising from the host's own microbiota, and most commonly involve the skin, soft tissues, bones, joints, or implanted medical devices. The bacterium also occasionally causes other types of infections such as necrotising pneumonia.

== Laboratory identification ==
=== Culture ===
Clinical specimens suspected of containing F. magna should be collected, transported, and processed using methods appropriate for anaerobic bacteria to minimize oxygen exposure.

=== Identification methods ===
Historically, identification of F. magna relied on colony morphology and biochemical testing. F. magna can be differentiated from other GPAC by its characteristic proteolytic enzyme profile including proline arylamidase, phenylalanine arylamidase, and pyroglutamyl acrylamidase activity. Commercial biochemical-based identification systems can accurately identify most clinical isolates. However, due to the slow growth rate of the bacterium, biochemical based assays have relatively slow turn around times.

Culture-independent identification methods may be necessary for certain clinical conditions such as culture-negative endocarditis and joint infections. A commercial multiplex PCR panel, that contains a target for F. magna, is available for synovial fluids.

== Antimicrobial susceptibility ==
Finegoldia magna is generally susceptible to antibiotics used to treat anaerobic infections such as penicillins, β-lactam/β-lactamase inhibitor combinations, carbapenems, and chloramphenicol. Strains of F. magna that are resistant to metronidazole, an antibiotic commonly used to treat serious anaerobic infections, have been reported. Specific resistance mechanisms to metronidazole have yet to be identified. Several metronidazole resistant strains of F. magna, have been reported to contain the nimB gene, which confers metronidazole resistance in Bacteroides.
