= Peptoniphilus urinimassiliensis =

Scientific classification
- Domain: Bacteria
- Kingdom: Bacillati
- Phylum: Bacillota
- Class: Clostridia
- Order: Tissierellales
- Family: Peptoniphilaceae
- Genus: Peptoniphilus
- Species: P. urinimassiliensis

Binomial name
- Peptoniphilus urinimassiliensis Brahimi et al. 2017

Type strain
- CSUR P3195, arseille-P3195

Bacterium

Peptoniphilus urinimassiliensis is a bacterium from the genus of Peptoniphilus which has been isolated from human urine.
