= Peptoniphilus duerdenii =

Scientific classification
- Domain: Bacteria
- Kingdom: Bacillati
- Phylum: Bacillota
- Class: Clostridia
- Order: Tissierellales
- Family: Peptoniphilaceae
- Genus: Peptoniphilus
- Species: P. duerdenii

Binomial name
- Peptoniphilus duerdenii Ulger-Toprak et al. 2012

Type strain
- ATCC BAA-1640, CCUG 56065, MML-09-169, WAL 1998L

Species of bacterium

Peptoniphilus duerdenii is a Gram-positive and anaerobic bacterium from the genus Peptoniphilus which has been isolated from a human wound.
