= Anaerococcus nagyae =

Scientific classification
- Domain: Bacteria
- Kingdom: Bacillati
- Phylum: Bacillota
- Class: Clostridia
- Order: Tissierellales
- Family: Peptoniphilaceae
- Genus: Anaerococcus
- Species: A. nagyae

Binomial name
- Anaerococcus nagyae Veloo et al. 2017

Synonyms
- Anaerococcus nagyae

Species of bacterium

Anaerococcus nagyae is a bacterium from the family Peptoniphilaceae. It was first found in a blood culture from a patient with ischemia and influenza. The cells of Anaerococcus nagyae are arranged in pairs. Although it can weakly ferment mannose, studies has shown this anaerobic bacteria can not ferment glucose and raffinose. A. nagyae is resistant to colistin, but it is susceptible to vancomycin and kanamycin.
