= Peptoniphilus lacydonensis =

Scientific classification
- Domain: Bacteria
- Kingdom: Bacillati
- Phylum: Bacillota
- Class: Clostridia
- Order: Tissierellales
- Family: Peptoniphilaceae
- Genus: Peptoniphilus
- Species: P. lacydonensis

Binomial name
- Peptoniphilus lacydonensis Beye et al. 2018

Type strain
- CSUR P2013, DSM 100661, strain EL1

Synonyms
- Peptoniphilus lacydonense

Species of bacterium

Peptoniphilus lacydonensis is a Gram-positive, anaerobic and microaerophilic bacterium from the genus Peptoniphilus which has been isolated from a patient with chronic refractory sinusitis.
