= Peptoniphilus senegalensis =

Scientific classification
- Domain: Bacteria
- Kingdom: Bacillati
- Phylum: Bacillota
- Class: Clostridia
- Order: Tissierellales
- Family: Peptoniphilaceae
- Genus: Peptoniphilus
- Species: P. senegalensis

Binomial name
- Peptoniphilus senegalensis Mishra et al. 2016

Type strain
- CSUR P154, DSM 25694, strain JC140

Species of bacterium

Peptoniphilus senegalensis is a Gram-positive, non-endospore-forming and non-motile bacterium from the genus Peptoniphilus which has been isolated from human feces from Dielmo in Senegal.
