= Peptoniphilus asaccharolyticus =

Scientific classification
- Domain: Bacteria
- Kingdom: Bacillati
- Phylum: Bacillota
- Class: Clostridia
- Order: Tissierellales
- Family: Peptoniphilaceae
- Genus: Peptoniphilus
- Species: P. asaccharolyticus

Binomial name
- Peptoniphilus asaccharolyticus (Distaso 1912) Ezaki et al. 2001

Synonyms
- Peptococcus asaccharolyticus (Distaso 1912) Douglas 1957; Peptostreptococcus asaccharolyticus (Distaso 1912) Ezaki et al. 1983; "Schleiferella asaccharolytica" Rajendram et al. 2001; Staphylococcus asaccharolyticus Distaso 1912

Species of bacterium

Peptoniphilus asaccharolyticus is a species of bacteria belonging to the family Peptoniphilaceae. The cells are small, spherical, and can occur in short chains, in pairs or individually. Peptostreptococcus are slow-growing bacteria sometimes resistant to antimicrobial drugs.

Peptoniphilus asaccharolyticus is present as part of the microbiota of the lower reproductive tract of women and has been recovered from women with pelvic inflammatory disease.
