= Genitourinary amoebiasis =

Genitourinary amoebiasis or renal amoebiasis is a rare complication to amoebic liver abscess, which in turn is a complication of amoebiasis. It is believed to result from liver abscesses breaking open, whereupon the amoebas spread through the blood to the new locale. Genital involvement is thought to result from fistula formation from the liver or through rectocolitis. The involvement causes lesions which exude a high degree of pus.
