= Anaerococcus hydrogenalis =

Scientific classification
- Domain: Bacteria
- Kingdom: Bacillati
- Phylum: Bacillota
- Class: Clostridia
- Order: Tissierellales
- Family: Peptoniphilaceae
- Genus: Anaerococcus
- Species: A. hydrogenalis

Binomial name
- Anaerococcus hydrogenalis (Ezaki et al. 1990) Ezaki et al. 2001

Synonyms
- Peptostreptococcus hydrogenalis

Species of bacterium

Anaerococcus hydrogenalis is a bacterium from the family Peptoniphilaceae. It is present in vaginal discharges and ovarian abscesses. Presence of Anaerococcus hydrogenalis in the gut metabolism and their coline consumption has been associated to cardiovascular diseases. Contrary to most of the species in this genus, Anaerococcus hydrogenalis is indole-positive. Also, some strains in this specie can produce urease.
