= Peptostreptococcus canis =

Scientific classification
- Domain: Bacteria
- Kingdom: Bacillati
- Phylum: Bacillota
- Class: Clostridia
- Order: Peptostreptococcales
- Family: Peptostreptococcaceae
- Genus: Peptostreptococcus
- Species: P. canis

Binomial name
- Peptostreptococcus canis Lawson et al. 2013

Species of bacterium

Peptostreptococcus canis is a bacterium from the family Peptostreptococcaceae.
