= Peptoniphilus harei =

Scientific classification
- Domain: Bacteria
- Kingdom: Bacillati
- Phylum: Bacillota
- Class: Clostridia
- Order: Tissierellales
- Family: Peptoniphilaceae
- Genus: Peptoniphilus
- Species: P. harei

Binomial name
- Peptoniphilus harei (Murdoch et al. 1997) Ezaki et al. 2001

Type strain
- CCUG 38491, CIP 105323, DSM 10020, NCTC 13076

Synonyms
- Peptostreptococcus harei Peptostreptococcus hareii Schleiferella harei

Species of bacterium

Peptoniphilus harei is a Gram-positive and anaerobic bacterium from the genus Peptoniphilus which has been isolated from humans.
