= Streptococcus constellatus =

Scientific classification
- Domain: Bacteria
- Kingdom: Bacillati
- Phylum: Bacillota
- Class: Bacilli
- Order: Lactobacillales
- Family: Streptococcaceae
- Genus: Streptococcus
- Species: S. constellatus

Binomial name
- Streptococcus constellatus (Prévot, 1924) Holdeman & Moore, 1974

Subspecies
- Streptococcus constellatus subsp. constellatus; Streptococcus constellatus subsp. pharyngis Whiley et al., 1999; Streptococcus constellatus subsp. viborgensis Jensen et al., 2013

Species of bacterium

Streptococcus constellatus is a species of Streptococcus bacteria that is part of the normal flora in the oral cavity, urogenital region, and intestinal tract. However, it can frequently cause purulent infections in other parts of the body. DNA homology studies and 16S rRNA sequence analysis demonstrate S. constellatus belongs to the Streptococcus anginosus group (milleri group) along with Streptococcus intermedius and Streptococcus anginosus.

== Morphology ==
S. constellatus are gram positive, non-sporing, non-motile, catalase negative cocci. The cells are small, normally 0.5-1μm in diameter and form short chains. Their cell wall peptidoglycan is composed of Lys-Ala_{1-3} and has a DNA G+C content of 37-38%.

== Metabolism and growth ==
In the presence of CO_{2} growth is enhanced, under aerobic conditions growth is reduced, and some strains require anaerobic conditions to grow.

S. constellatus produces major amounts of lactic acid, fermented glucose, maltose and sucrose, but not lactose and hydrolyzed aesculin.

=== Biochemical characteristics ===
The typical species is Lancefield Groups A, C, G, and F, with the remaining NG (non-groupable) and haemolysis on blood agar is β-haemolytic and NH (non-haemolytic).

Enzyme	S. constellatus	S. anginosus	S. intermedius
Beta-D-fucosidase	-	-	+
Beta-N-acetylglucosaminidase	-	-	+
Beta-N-galactosaminidase	-	-	+
Sialidase	-	-	+
Beta-galactosidase	-	-	+
Beta-glucosidase	-	+	+/-
Hyaluronidase	+	-	+

== Disease ==
Clinically it is associated with abscess formation in the upper body and respiratory tract. It has also been found to be involved with pulmonary exacerbations in cystic fibrosis patients and can lead to toxic shock and limb amputation.

== Subspecies ==
Evidence supports the further subdivision of S. constellatus into three subspecies, S. constellatus subsp. constellatus and S. constellatus subsp. pharyngis and Streptococcus constellatus subsp. viborgensis.

=== S. constellatus subsp. constellatus ===
Normally found in the oral cavities and upper respiratory tracts and isolated from purulent human infections, including appendicitis. Strains are frequently β-haemolyic and belong to Lancefield Group F or are nonhaemolytic (α and γ) and serologically ungroupable. However, a few strains react with Lancefield Group A, C, and G antisera.

Most strains produce:

- α-glucosidase, but very few produce: β-galactosidase and β-glucosidase

Most strains do NOT produce:

- β-N-acetylglucosaminidase
- β-D-fucosidase
- α-galactosidase
- β-glucuronidase
- pyrrolidonylarylamidase
- sialidase

=== S. constellatus subsp. pharyngis ===
Normally found in infections of the human throat, patients with pharyngitis. Strains frequency are β-haemolytic and belong to Lancefield C.

Most strains produce:

- β-N-acetylgalactosaminidase
- β-D-fucosidase
- α-galactosidase
- α-glucosidase
- β-glucosdiase
- β-N-acetylglucosaminidase

Most strains do NOT produce:

- α-galactosidase
- β-glucuronidase
- pyrrolidonylarylamidase
- sialidase

== See also ==
- Streptococcus milleri group
- Streptococcus intermedius
- Streptococcus anginosus
