= Peptostreptococcus anaerobius =

Scientific classification
- Domain: Bacteria
- Kingdom: Bacillati
- Phylum: Bacillota
- Class: Clostridia
- Order: Peptostreptococcales
- Family: Peptostreptococcaceae
- Genus: Peptostreptococcus
- Species: P. anaerobius

Binomial name
- Peptostreptococcus anaerobius (Natvig 1905) Kluyver and van Niel 1936

Synonyms
- "Streptococcus anaerobius"

Species of bacterium

Peptostreptococcus anaerobius is a species of bacteria belonging to the Peptostreptococcus genus of anaerobic, Gram-positive, non-spore forming bacteria. The cells are small, spherical, and can occur in short chains, in pairs or individually. Peptostreptococcus are slow-growing bacteria sometimes resistance to antimicrobial drugs. P. anaerobius is intrinsically resistant to sodium polyethanol sulfonate (SPS), a component found in many types of blood culture media.

Peptostreptococcus anaerobius is present as part of the microbiota of the lower reproductive tract of women and has been recovered from women with pelvic inflammatory disease and bacterial vaginosis.

It is one of several bacteria in the human microbiome associated with the development of colorectal cancer and cervical cancer.

== See also ==
- List of bacterial vaginosis microbiota
