= Peptoniphilus ivorii =

Scientific classification
- Domain: Bacteria
- Kingdom: Bacillati
- Phylum: Bacillota
- Class: Clostridia
- Order: Tissierellales
- Family: Peptoniphilaceae
- Genus: Peptoniphilus
- Species: P. ivorii

Binomial name
- Peptoniphilus ivorii (Murdoch et al. 1997) Ezaki et al. 2001

Type strain
- CCUG 38492, CIP 105325, DSM 10022, NCTC 13078

Synonyms
- Peptostreptococcus ivoricus Peptostreptococcus ivorii

Species of bacterium

Peptoniphilus ivorii is a bacterium from the genus of Peptoniphilus which has been isolated from a leg ulcer.
