= Anaerococcus lactolyticus =

Scientific classification
- Domain: Bacteria
- Kingdom: Bacillati
- Phylum: Bacillota
- Class: Clostridia
- Order: Tissierellales
- Family: Peptoniphilaceae
- Genus: Anaerococcus
- Species: A. lactolyticus

Binomial name
- Anaerococcus lactolyticus (Li et al. 1992) Ezaki et al. 2001

Synonyms
- Peptostreptococcus lactolyticus

Species of bacterium

Anaerococcus lactolyticus is a bacterium from the family Peptoniphilaceae. A. lactolyticus along A. vaginalis can be a dominant species in Diabetic foot and pressure ulcers. It can also participate in polymicrobial infections of the urinary tract.
