= Gemella palaticanis =

Scientific classification
- Domain: Bacteria
- Kingdom: Bacillati
- Phylum: Bacillota
- Class: Bacilli
- Order: Bacillales
- Family: Staphylococcaceae
- Genus: Gemella
- Species: G. palaticanis

Binomial name
- Gemella palaticanis Collins et al. 1999

Species of bacterium

Gemella palaticanis is a species of bacteria within the genus Gemella. Strains of this species were originally isolated from the mouth of a dog and are unique among Gemella species in that they can ferment lactose.
