= Peptostreptococcus porci =

Scientific classification
- Domain: Bacteria
- Kingdom: Bacillati
- Phylum: Bacillota
- Class: Clostridia
- Order: Peptostreptococcales
- Family: Peptostreptococcaceae
- Genus: Peptostreptococcus
- Species: P. porci

Binomial name
- Peptostreptococcus porci Wylensek et al. 2021

Species of bacterium

Peptostreptococcus porci is a bacterial species in the Peptostreptococcaceae family.
