= Liver abscess =

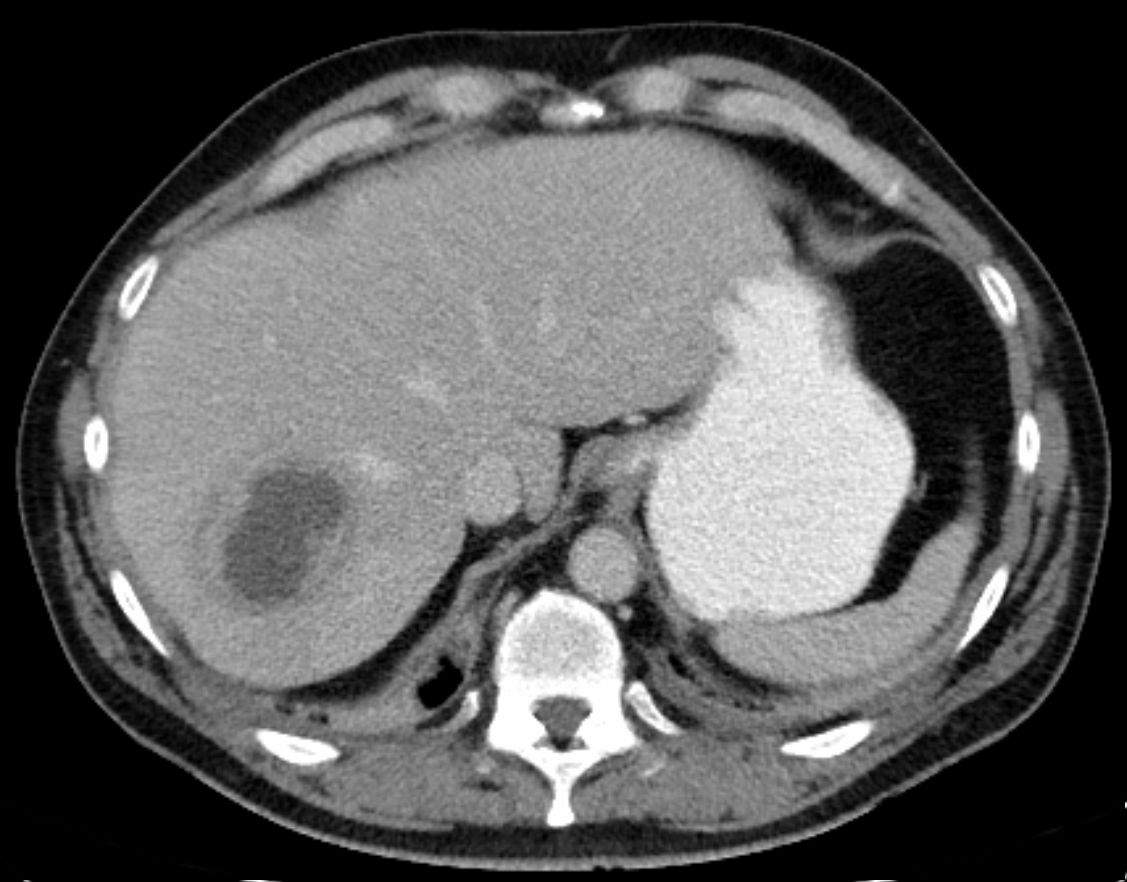
- Liver abscess on axial CT image: a hypodense lesion in the liver with peripherally enhancement.
- Specialty: Gastroenterology

A liver abscess is a mass filled with pus inside the liver. Common causes are abdominal conditions such as appendicitis or diverticulitis due to haematogenous spread through the portal vein. It can also develop as a complication of a liver injury.

== Causes ==
Risk factors for developing liver abscess can be due to infection, post-procedural infection and metastasis such as primary liver tumours, liver metastasis, biliary procedures, biliary injuries, biliary tract disease, appendicitis, and diverticulitis.

Major bacterial causes of liver abscess include the following:

- Streptococcus species (including Enterococcus)
- Escherichia species
- Staphylococcus species
- Klebsiella species (Higher rates in the Far East)
- Anaerobes (including Bacteroides species)
- Pseudomonas species
- Proteus species
- Entamoeba histolytica

However, as noted above, many cases are not polymicrobial.

== Diagnosis ==
=== Types ===
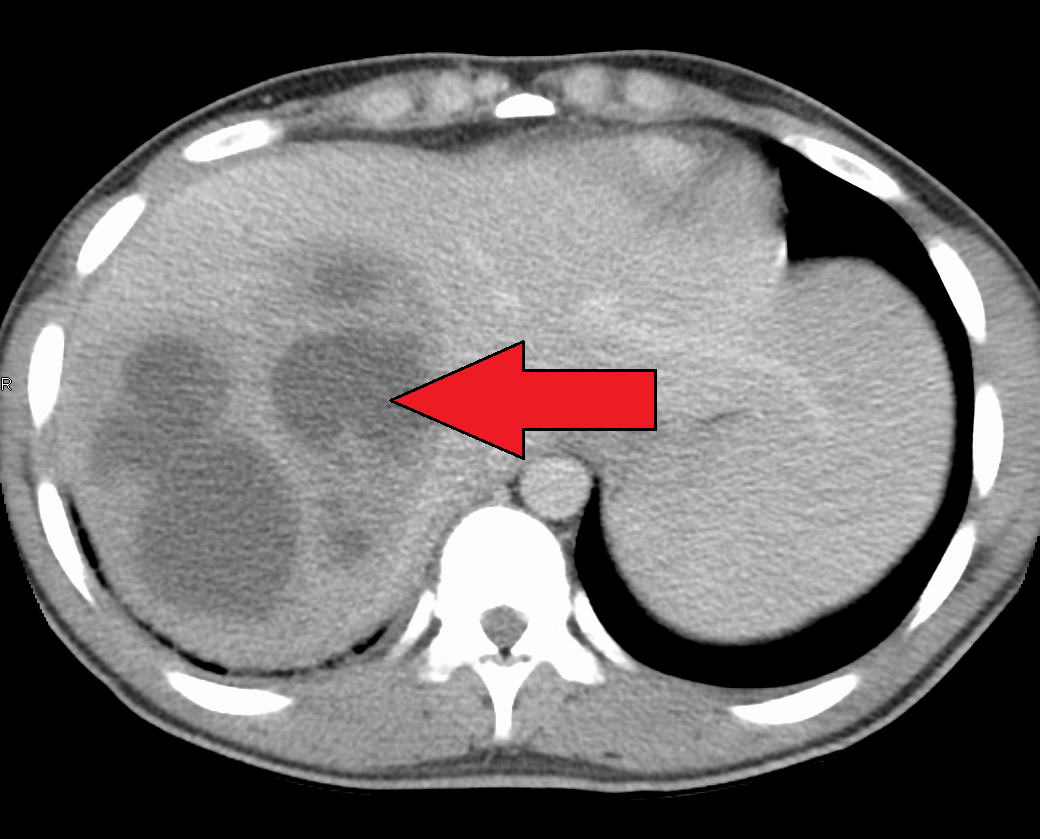
A large pyogenic liver abscess presumed to be the result of appendicitis

There are several major forms of liver abscess, classified by cause:

- Pyogenic liver abscess, which is most often polymicrobial, accounts for 80% of hepatic abscess cases in the United States.
- Amoebic liver abscess due to Entamoeba histolytica accounts for 10% of cases. The incidence is much higher in developing countries.
- Fungal abscess, most often due to Candida species, accounts for less than 10% of cases.
- Iatrogenic abscess, caused by medical interventions

== Management ==
Draining of the abscess and antibiotics: IV metronidazole and third generation cephalosporin/quinolones, β-lactam antibiotics, and aminoglycosides are effective.

== Prognosis ==
The prognosis has improved for liver abscesses. The mortality rate in-hospital is about 2.5-19%. The elderly, ICU admissions, shock, cancer, fungal infections, cirrhosis, chronic kidney disease, acute respiratory failure, severe disease, or disease of biliary origin have a worse prognosis.
