= Peptostreptococcus russellii =

Scientific classification
- Domain: Bacteria
- Kingdom: Bacillati
- Phylum: Bacillota
- Class: Clostridia
- Order: Peptostreptococcales
- Family: Peptostreptococcaceae
- Genus: Peptostreptococcus
- Species: P. russellii

Binomial name
- Peptostreptococcus russellii Whitehead et al. 2011

Species of bacterium

Peptostreptococcus russellii is a bacterium from the family Peptostreptococcaceae.
