= Aedoeadaptatus =

Scientific classification
- Domain: Bacteria
- Kingdom: Bacillati
- Phylum: Bacillota
- Class: Clostridia
- Order: Tissierellales
- Family: Peptoniphilaceae
- Genus: Aedoeadaptatus; Hitch et al. 2022

Type species
- Aedoeadaptatus acetigenes Hitch et al. 2022

Species
- A. acetigenes; "A. coli"; A. coxii; A. ivorii; A. nemausensis; "A. pacaensis"; "A. urinae"

Genus of bacteria

Aedoeadaptatus is a monotypic genus in the family of Peptoniphilaceae. The only described species is Aedoeadaptatus acetigenes.

== Phylogeny ==
The currently accepted taxonomy is based on the List of Prokaryotic names with Standing in Nomenclature (LPSN) and National Center for Biotechnology Information (NCBI)

16S rRNA based LTP_10_2024

- Aedoeadaptatus
  - - A. acetigenes
    - A. ivorii
  - - A. coxii
    - A. nemausensis

120 marker proteins based GTDB 09-RS220

- Aedoeadaptatus
  - A. ivorii (Murdoch et al. 1997) Malhotra, Bello & Gupta 2024
  - - - A. coxii Citron, Tyrrell & Goldstein 2013) Malhotra, Bello & Gupta 2024
      - A. nemausensis (Aujoulat et al. 2022) Malhotra, Bello & Gupta 2024
    - - - "A. pacaensis" (Diop et al. 2016) Malhotra, Bello & Gupta 2024
        - "A. urinae" Mbaye et al. 2022) Malhotra, Bello & Gupta 2024
      - - "Peptoniphilus rachelemmaiella" Hurst et al. 2022
        - - A. acetigenes Hitch et al. 2022
          - "A. coli" (Mbaye et al. 2022) Malhotra, Bello & Gupta 2024

== See also ==
- List of bacterial orders
- List of bacteria genera
