= Gemella sanguinis =

Scientific classification
- Domain: Bacteria
- Kingdom: Bacillati
- Phylum: Bacillota
- Class: Bacilli
- Order: Caryophanales
- Family: Gemellaceae
- Genus: Gemella
- Species: G. sanguinis

Binomial name
- Gemella sanguinis Collins et al. 1998

Species of bacterium

Gemella sanguinis is a species of gram-positive bacteria within the genus Gemella. Strains of this species were originally isolated from samples of human blood, and in one case from a patient with endocarditis. Additional cases of endocarditis associated with G. sanguinis infections have been reported.
