= Anaerococcus tetradius =

Scientific classification
- Domain: Bacteria
- Kingdom: Bacillati
- Phylum: Bacillota
- Class: Clostridia
- Order: Tissierellales
- Family: Peptoniphilaceae
- Genus: Anaerococcus
- Species: A. tetradius

Binomial name
- Anaerococcus tetradius (Ezaki et al. 1983) Ezaki et al. 2001

Synonyms
- Gaffkya anaerobia Gaffkya anaerobius Peptostreptococcus tetradius Tetracoccus anaerobius

Species of bacterium

Anaerococcus tetradius is a bacterium from the family Peptoniphilaceae. It was first isolated from vaginal discharges and ovarian abscesses, but is a common member of the vaginal flora.

== Biochemistry ==
A. tetradius can ferment glucose and mannose.
