= Gemella =

Scientific classification
- Domain: Bacteria
- Kingdom: Bacillati
- Phylum: Bacillota
- Class: Bacilli
- Order: Caryophanales
- Family: Gemellaceae; Chuvochina et al. 2024
- Genus: Gemella; Berger 1960

Type species
- Gemella haemolysans (Thjøtta & Bøe 1938) Berger 1960

Species
- G. asaccharolytic; G. bergeri; G. cuniculi; G. haemolysans; G. massiliensis; G. morbillorum; G. palaticanis; G. parahaemolysans; G. sanguinis; G. taiwanensis

Synonyms
- Gemelliphila Bello et al. 2024

Genus of bacteria

Gemella is a genus of Gram-positive bacteria from the order Caryophanales. Members of the genus thrive best at high partial pressure of CO_{2}.

== Description ==
A Gemella species was first described as Neisseria hemolysans in 1938. It was reclassified as a new genus in 1960 when strains were found to be distinct enough from Neisseria to require a new genus. The name was suggested based on the organism being a diplococcus and gemellus is the diminutive of geminus, which is Latin for twin. They are facultatively anaerobic and give negative reactions to both oxidase and catalase tests. They are obligately fermentative, producing either a mixture of acetic and lactic acids or an equimolar molar mixture of acetic acid and CO_{2}. For example, G. haemolysans ferments glucose forming a mixture of acetic and lactic acids in the absence of oxygen, whereas when oxygen is present, it forms acetic acid and CO_{2}.

== Clinical importance ==
Gemella bacteria are primarily found in the mucous membranes of humans and other animals, particularly in the oral cavity and upper digestive tract. Gemella haemolysans has been found to be involved in pulmonary exacerbations of cystic fibrosis patients. As of the year 2000 it had been reported in 15 cases of human endocarditis, mainly in men with underlying valvular disease and/or poor dentition or dental manipulation. Most cases were treated with a combination of penicillin and gentamicin with a favorable outcome. Additionally, Gemella asaccharolytica in bacterial vaginosis is associated with increase risk of HIV infection in unprotected sex.

== Phylogeny ==
The currently accepted taxonomy is based on the List of Prokaryotic names with Standing in Nomenclature (LPSN) and National Center for Biotechnology Information (NCBI).

16S rRNA based LTP_10_2024

- Gemella
  - G. taiwanensis Hung et al. 2014
  - - G. haemolysans (Thjøtta & Bøe 1938) Berger 1960
    - - G. parahaemolysans Hung et al. 2014
      - - G. sanguinis Collins et al. 1999
        - - G. morbillorum (Prévot 1933) Kilpper-Bälz & Schleifer 1988
          - - G. cuniculi Hoyles et al. 2000
            - - - G. bergeri corrig. Collins et al. 1998
                - G. massiliensis Mbogning Fonkou et al. 2023
              - - G. asaccharolytic Ulger-Toprak et al. 2010
                - G. palaticanis Collins et al. 1999

120 marker proteins based GTDB 09-RS220

- Gemella
  - - G. asaccharolytic
    - G. palaticanis
  - - - G. bergeri
      - G. massiliensis
    - - G. cuniculi
      - - G. sanguinis
        - - G. morbillorum
          - G. haemolysans
