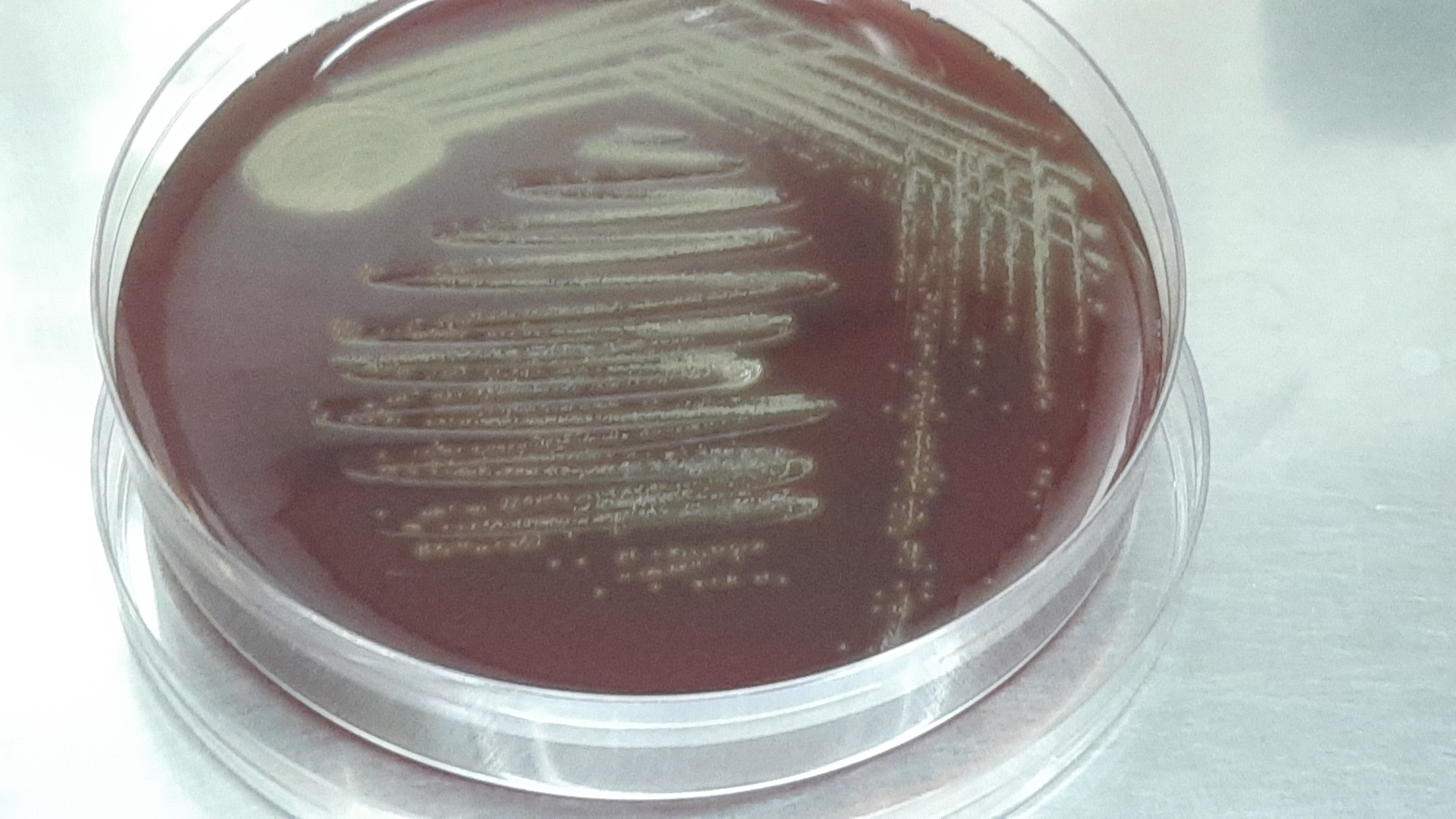
- Colonies of Gemella morbillorum on blood agar

Scientific classification
- Domain: Bacteria
- Kingdom: Bacillati
- Phylum: Bacillota
- Class: Bacilli
- Order: Caryophanales
- Family: Gemellaceae
- Genus: Gemella
- Species: G. morbillorum

Binomial name
- Gemella morbillorum (Prévot 1933) Kilpper-Bälz and Schleifer 1988

= Gemella morbillorum =

Species of bacterium

Gemella morbillorum is a species of bacteria within the genus Gemella. It is a facultative anaerobic Gram positive coccus usually preferring capnophilic or microaerophilic environments. From its discovery in 1917 by R. Tunnicliff until 1988, it was known as Streptococcus morbillorum (and briefly as Peptostreptococcus morbillorum). The name change followed closer examination with DNA filter hybridization (by Kilpper-Balz and Schleifer) which found it was very close to the species Gemella haemolysans.

== Pathogenicity ==
Gemella morbillorum is rarely a cause of disease in humans, though it may be found benignly in the oropharyngeal area. Infections, when found, are similar to viridans Streptococci in range. Cases have been reported of endovascular infections (predominantly endocarditis) and also acute invasive infections. It has also been reported as among the most common bacteria present in teeth with cysts that do not resolve after repeated root canal treatments.

A report of a human infection involving G. morbillorum in an Indian child was reported in 1999.

Strains of this species are commonly resistant to penicillin.

Bacteremia with G. morbillorum, among other bacteria, has been associated with colorectal cancer.
