= Amoebic liver abscess =

Amoebic hepatic abscess
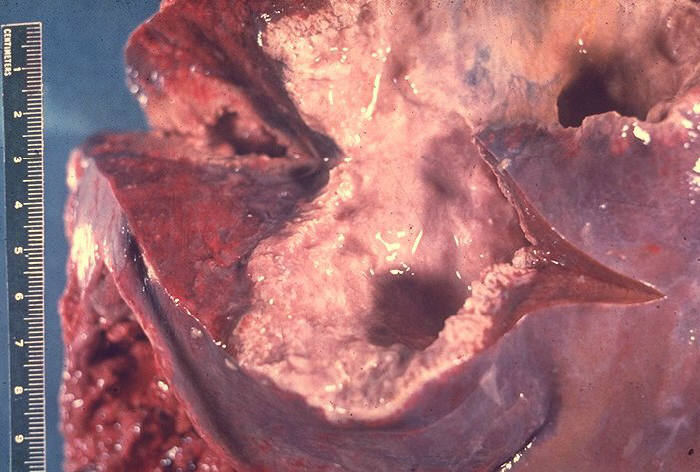
- Gross pathology of liver containing amoebic abscess
- Specialty: Infectious diseases

A amoebic liver abscess is a type of liver abscess caused by amebiasis. It is the involvement of liver tissue by trophozoites of the organism Entamoeba histolytica and of its abscess due to necrosis.

== Presentation ==
Approximately 90% of patients with E histolytica are asymptomatic. The two most common manifestations of E histolytica include colitis (bloody stool with mucus, abdominal pain, and/or diarrhea), and discovery of a liver abscess on imaging. Liver abscesses commonly present as right upper quadrant abdominal pain and fever, with worsening features associated with abscess rupture.

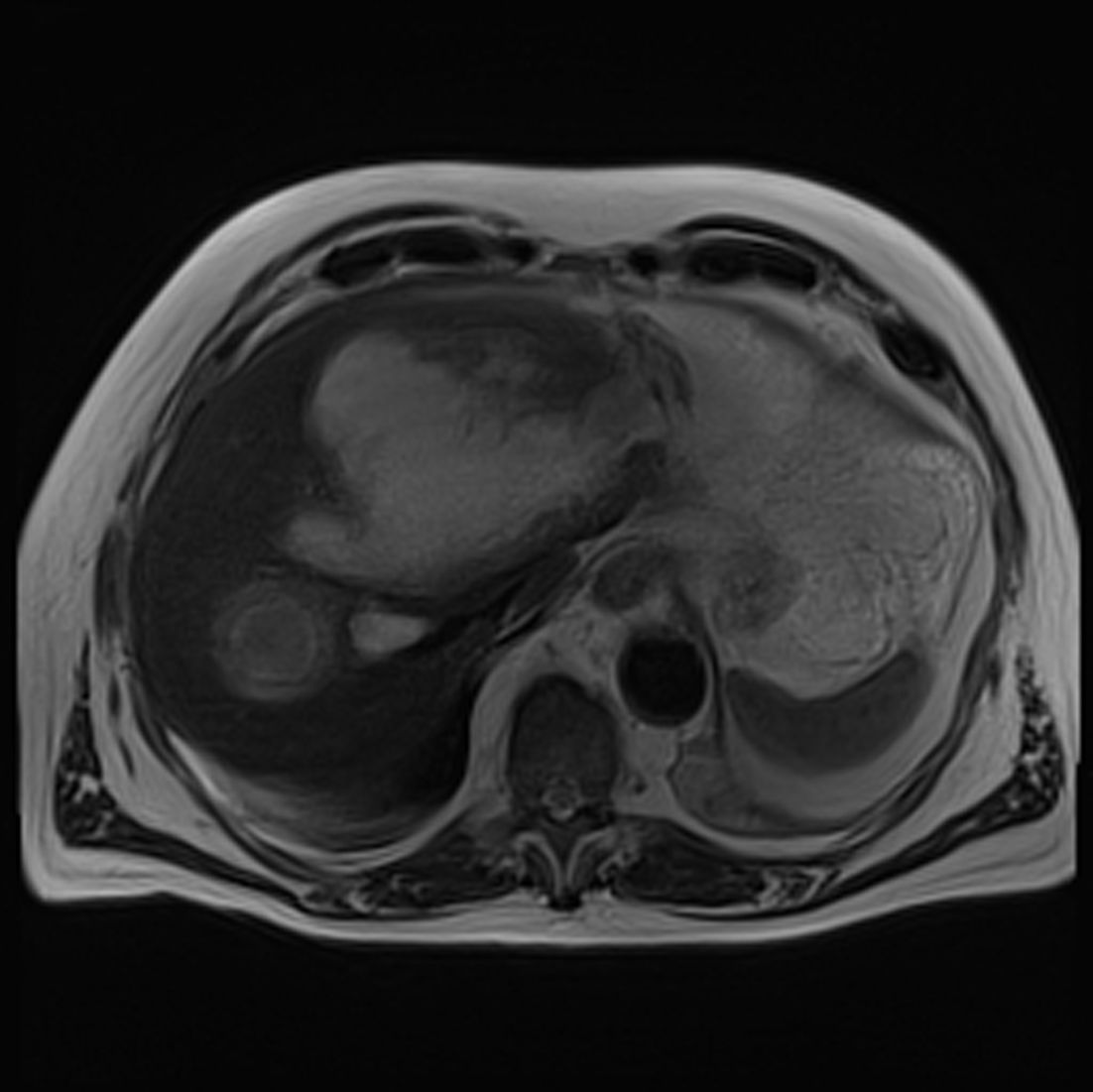
Magnetic resonance cholangiopancreatography (MRC) image showing a voluminous and heterogeneous collection in the left liver lobe (amoebic abscess)

=== Symptoms ===
- Pain right hypochondrium referred to the right shoulder
- Pyrexia (100.4 F)
- Profuse sweating and rigors
- Loss of weight
- Earthy complexion

=== Signs ===
- Pallor
- Tenderness and rigidity in right hypochondrium
- Palpable liver
- Intercostal tenderness
- Basal lung signs

== Diagnosis ==
Diagnosis is primarily made by identifying stool ova and parasites on stool antigen testing in the presence of colitis, or E histolytica serology.

- Blood ceruloplasmin
- Haemoglobin estimation
- Stools examination (trophozoites and cysts)
- Radiography
- Aspiration exploratory
- Medical ultrasonography and CT scanning
- Sigmoidoscopy
- Liver function tests
- Serological tests

== Treatment ==
Although medical management using long courses of antibiotics have proven to be successful, Drainage of the abscess is the mainstay treatment.

== Research ==
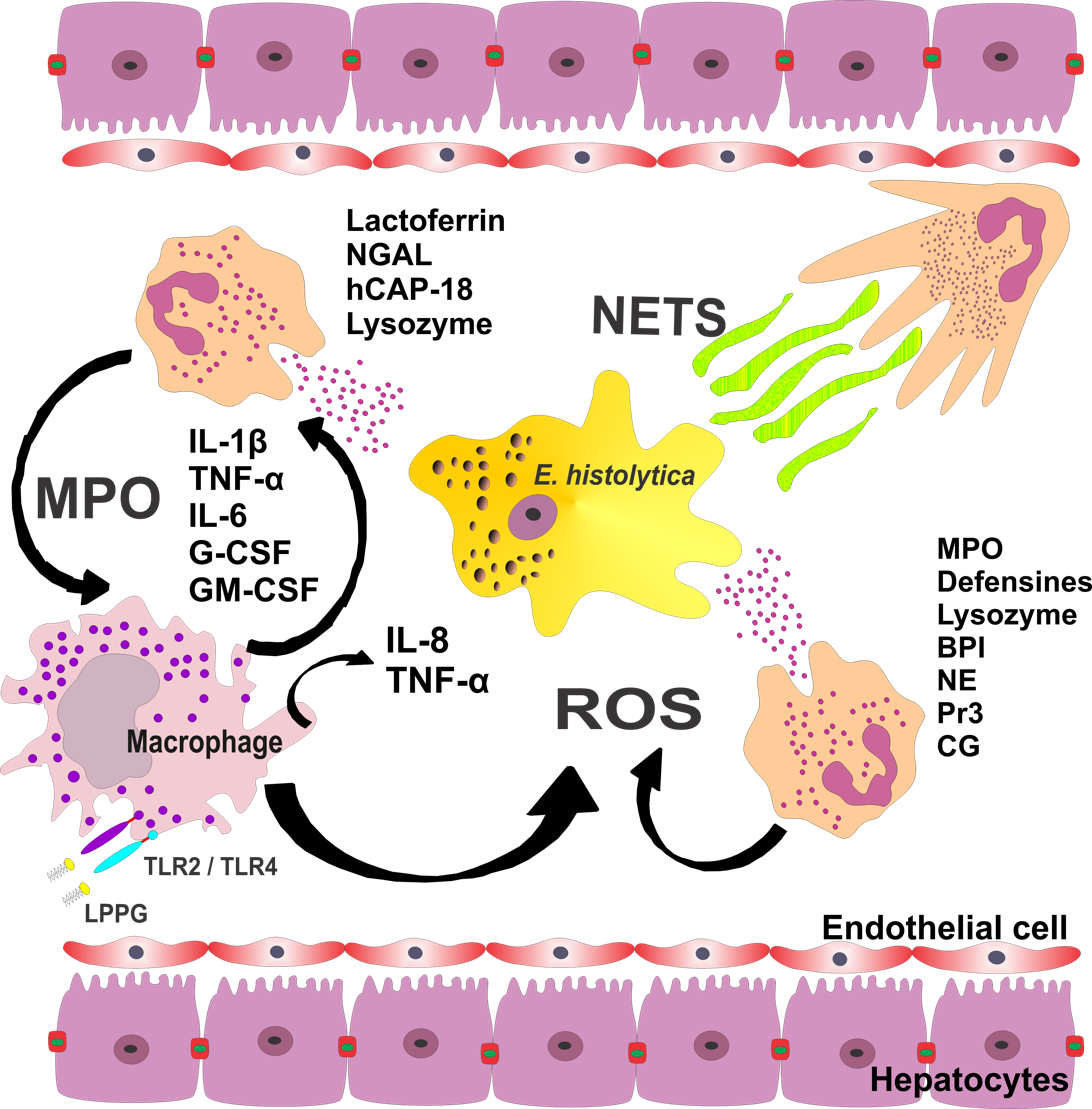
Role of neutrophils in rodent amebic liver abscess

Due to the difficulty of exploring host and amebic factors involved in the pathogenesis of amebic liver abscess in humans, most studies have been conducted with animal models (e.g., mice, gerbils, and hamsters). Histopathological findings revealed that the chronic phase of amebic liver abscess in humans corresponds to lytic or liquefactive necrosis, whereas in rodent models there is granulomatous inflammation. However, the use of animal models has provided important information on molecules and mechanisms of the host/parasite interaction in amebic liver abscess.

== See also ==
- Genitourinary amoebiasis
