= Finegoldia =

Scientific classification
- Domain: Bacteria
- Kingdom: Bacillati
- Phylum: Bacillota
- Class: Clostridia
- Order: Tissierellales
- Family: Peptoniphilaceae
- Genus: Finegoldia; Murdoch & Shah 2000

Type species
- Finegoldia magna (Prévot 1933) Murdoch & Shah 2000

Species
- F. dalianensis; F. magna

Genus of bacteria

Finegoldia is a genus of Gram-positive bacteria. They are anaerobic cocci of the class Clostridia, with Finegoldia magna being the type species. F. magna was formerly known, along with several other Gram-positive anaerobic cocci (GPACs), as Peptostreptococcus magnus, but was moved into its own genus in 1999. The name is in honor of Sydney M. Finegold, an American microbiologist, while magna is Latin for large. It is an opportunistic human pathogen that normally colonizes skin and mucous membranes. It is often seen in biofilms on chronic ulcers such as in diabetic foot or decubitus ulcers. Most surveys have found it to be susceptible to penicillins, carbapenems and metronidazole, though resistant strains have been identified. Resistance to clindamycin is common and has been seen in over 10% of isolates in the US. One review stated that "the combination of diminished antimicrobial susceptibility, its prevalence, and the described virulence factors gives F. magna a special position among the GPAC."
