= Peptoniphilus =

Scientific classification
- Domain: Bacteria
- Kingdom: Bacillati
- Phylum: Bacillota
- Class: Clostridia
- Order: Tissierellales
- Family: Peptoniphilaceae
- Genus: Peptoniphilus; Ezaki et al. 2001

Type species
- Peptoniphilus asaccharolyticus (Distaso 1912) Ezaki et al. 2001

Species
- See text

Synonyms
- Anaerosphaera Ueki et al. 2009; "Schleiferella" Rajendram et al. 2001

Genus of bacteria

Peptoniphilus is a genus of bacteria in the phylum Bacillota (Bacteria).

== Etymology ==
The name Peptoniphilus derives from:Neo-Latin noun peptonum, peptone; Neo-Latin adjective philus from Greek adjective philos (φίλος) meaning friend, loving; Neo-Latin masculine gender noun Peptoniphilus, friend of peptone, referring to the use of peptone as a major energy source.

== Classification ==
Peptoniphilus are gram positive anaerobic cocci that were formerly classified in the genus Peptostreptococcus. They are non-saccharolytic, use peptone as a major energy source and produce butyrate.

== Clinical relevance ==
This genus is part of the vaginal and gut microbiota. They have been reported to as present in diabetic skin and soft tissue infections, bone and joint infections, surgical site infections, chorioamnionitis and bloodstream infections. They are typically found as part of polymicrobial infections but are difficult to recover with usual clinical cultures. They have been increasingly reported with the more widespread use of 16S PCR and MALDI-TOF for identification. They are noted to be linked with an impairment of wound-healing in patients with diabetic foot ulcers if present in abundance during the initial infection.

== Phylogeny ==
The currently accepted taxonomy is based on the List of Prokaryotic names with Standing in Nomenclature (LPSN) and National Center for Biotechnology Information (NCBI)

16S rRNA based LTP_10_2024

- - - Peptoniphilus species‑group 2
      - P. methioninivorax Rooney et al. 2011
      - P. stercorisuis Johnson et al. 2014
  - - Anaerosphaera
      - A. aminiphila Ueki et al. 2009
      - A. multitolerans Rettenmaier, Liebl & Zverlov 2019
    - Peptoniphilus
      - - P. equinus Jung et al. 2023
        - - P. asaccharolyticus (Distaso 1912) Ezaki et al. 2001
          - P. indolicus (Christiansen 1934) Ezaki et al. 2001
      - - P. catoniae Patel et al. 2016
        - - P. koenoeneniae Ulger-Toprak et al. 2012
          - - P. duerdenii Ulger-Toprak et al. 2012
            - - P. lacrimalis (Li et al. 1992) Ezaki et al. 2001
              - - "P. obesi" Mishra et al. 2013
                - - - P. lacydonensis Beye et al. 2018
                    - P. rhinitidis Kim et al. 2021
                  - - P. ovalis
                    - - - P. gorbachii Song, Liu & Finegold 2010
                        - - P. tyrrelliae Citron, Tyrrell & Goldstein 2013
                          - P. senegalensis Mishra et al. 2016
                      - - - P. faecalis Ryu et al. 2021
                          - P. porci Wylensek et al. 2021
                        - - P. harei (Murdoch et al. 1997) Ezaki et al. 2001
                          - P. timonensis Mishra et al. 2015

120 marker proteins based GTDB 09-RS220

- Peptoniphilus
  - - P. duerdenii
    - P. koenoeneniae
  - - - - P. asaccharolyticus
        - P. indolicus
      - - - "P. obesi"
          - P. catoniae
        - - "P. mikwangii" Cho et al. 2015
          - - P. stercorisuis
            - - Anaerosphaera aminiphila
              - Anaerosphaera multitolerans
    - - - P. lacrimalis
        - "P. raoultii" Diop et al. 2016
      - - P. ovalis Li et al. 2022
        - - P. lacydonensis [incl. P. rhinitidis]
          - - - P. timonensis
              - - P. harei
                - "P. vaginalis" Diop et al. 2016
            - - P. faecalis [incl. P. porci]
              - - P. senegalensis [incl. P. tyrrelliae]
                - - P. gorbachii
                  - "P. grossensis" Mishra et al. 2012

Species incertae sedis:

- "P. duodeni" Maihe et al. 2017
- "P. genitalis" Abou Chacra et al. 2024
- "P. hominis" Hitch et al. 2024 non Huang et al. 2024
- "P. hominis" Huang et al. 2024 non Hitch et al. 2024
- P. ivorii
- "Ca. P. massiliensis" Fenollar et al. 2006
- P. olsenii Song, Liu & Finegold 2010
- "P. phoceensis" Mourembou et al. 2016
- "P. nemausus" Enault et al. 2019
- "P. septimus" Wang et al. 2022
- P. urinimassiliensis

== See also ==
- Bacterial taxonomy
- List of bacteria genera
- List of bacterial orders
- List of bacterial vaginosis microbiota
- Microbiology
