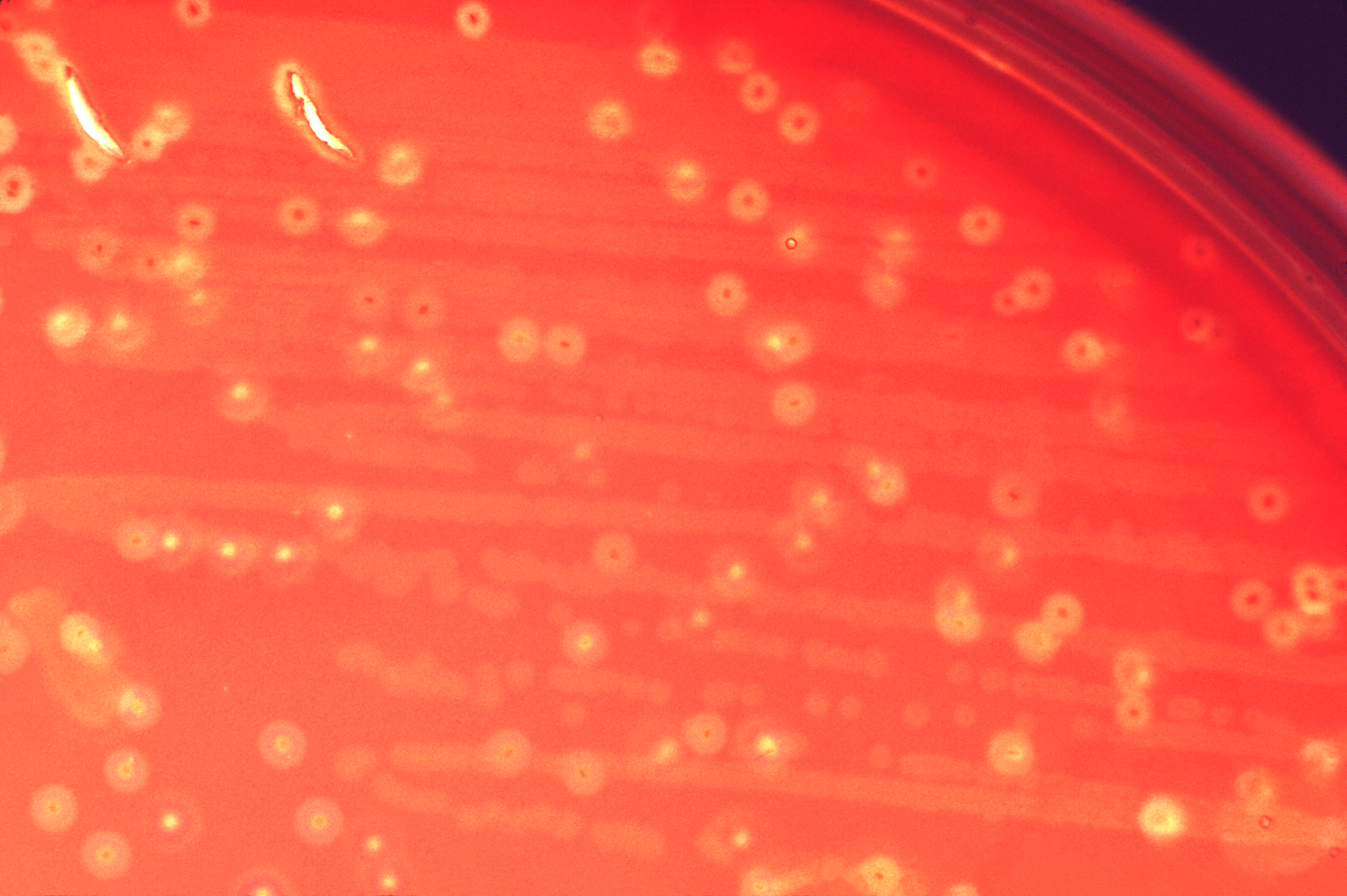
- Cultures of Streptococcus anginosus on blood agar

Scientific classification
- Domain: Bacteria
- Phylum: Bacillota
- Class: Bacilli
- Order: Lactobacillales
- Family: Streptococcaceae
- Genus: Streptococcus
- Species group: Streptococcus anginosus group

= Streptococcus anginosus group =

Species of bacterium

The Streptococcus anginosus group (SAG), also known as the anginosus group streptococci (AGS) or the milleri group streptococci (MGS), are a group of several species of streptococci with clinical similarities. The group is named after a principal member species, Streptococcus anginosus. The older name Streptococcus milleri (as well as Streptococcus milleri group, SMG) is now pseudotaxonomic, as the idea that these streptococci constituted a single species was incorrect. The anginosus group streptococci are members of the viridans streptococci group. They have been implicated as etiologic agents in a variety of serious purulent infections, but because of their heterogeneous characteristics, these organisms may be unrecognized or misidentified by clinical laboratorians. The unique characteristic of them from other pathogenic streptococci, such as S. pyogenes and S. agalactiae, is their ability to cause abscesses.

== Species ==
Members include:

- Streptococcus anginosus
- Streptococcus constellatus
  - S. constellatus subsp. constellatus
  - S. constellatus subsp. pharyngis
- Streptococcus intermedius

== Nomenclature ==
These nonhemolytic viridans streptococci were first described by Guthof in 1956 after he isolated them from dental abscesses. He named these organisms Streptococcus milleri in honor of the microbiologist W. D. Miller.

== Occurrence ==
The organisms were subsequently recognized as normal flora of the human oral cavity and gastrointestinal tract with the ability to cause abscesses and systemic infections.
