= Parvimonas micra =

Scientific classification
- Domain: Bacteria
- Kingdom: Bacillati
- Phylum: Bacillota
- Class: Clostridia
- Order: Tissierellales
- Family: Peptoniphilaceae
- Genus: Parvimonas
- Species: P. micra

Binomial name
- Parvimonas micra (Prévot 1933) Tindall and Euzéby 2006

Species of bacterium

Parvimonas micra is a Gram positive anaerobic coccus which is frequently isolated from dental plaque in patients with chronic periodontitis. It is a common constituent of mixed anaerobic infections such as intra-abdominal abscess. It has rarely been implicated as a sole pathogen in septic arthritis, osteomyelitis and discitis associated with recent dental procedures.
