= Streptococcus intermedius =

Scientific classification
- Domain: Bacteria
- Kingdom: Bacillati
- Phylum: Bacillota
- Class: Bacilli
- Order: Lactobacillales
- Family: Streptococcaceae
- Genus: Streptococcus
- Species: S. intermedius

Binomial name
- Streptococcus intermedius Prévot 1925 (Approved Lists 1980)

Aerotolerant anaerobic commensal bacterium with pathogenic potential

Streptococcus intermedius is an aerotolerant anaerobic commensal bacterium and a member of the Streptococcus anginosus group. The S. anginosus group, occasionally termed “Streptococcus milleri group” (SMG) display hemolytic and serologic diversity, yet share core physiological traits. Though the three members of the SMG are phenotypically diverse, one common trait they share is the mechanism of producing the metabolite diacetyl, which contributes to generating a signature caramel odor. Despite being commensal organisms, members of the S. anginosus group display wide pathogenic potential. S. intermedius has been isolated from patients with periodontitis and fatal purulent infections, especially brain and liver abscesses.

Researchers identified the isolates to species that led to 118 cases of infection due to SMG using 16S rRNA gene sequence and biochemical tests. This study, done in 2002 used identification of clinical isolates recovered and stored at the Microbiology Laboratory, Veterans Affairs Medical Center, Houston during 1989–1999. It has been difficult to reliably identify the differences between the members of SMG on a species level. However, some additional approaches to isolate this strain include analyzing blood agar plates, real-time PCR, and mass spectrometry. In summary, different strains were characterized as belonging to the Streptococcus milleri group. S. intermedius was found to be the least commonly isolated member of the SMG (14 of 122 isolates). The majority of which (12 or 86%) were recovered from an abscess or from a site associated with an abscess (blood abscess). Therefore 86% of isolates of this species were attributed to an abscess. The limited study and clinical data on how to treat symptoms of brain and liver abscess include abscess drainage, surgery, and taking preventative antibiotics that include a combination of ceftriaxone and metronidazole. Data from the study support observations that members of the SMG have a tendency to cause abscesses, however they do not cause them with equal frequency. S. intermedius were more likely to cause deep-seated abscess and was found as a solitary isolate in specimens obtained.
