= Peptoniphilaceae =

Scientific classification
- Domain: Bacteria
- Kingdom: Bacillati
- Phylum: Bacillota
- Class: Clostridia
- Order: Tissierellales
- Family: Peptoniphilaceae; Johnson et al. 2014

Genera
- See text

Family of bacteria

The Peptoniphilaceae are a family of bacteria in the class Clostridia.

== Taxonomy ==
Not validly published genera in Peptoniphilaceae.

- Khoudiadiopia, with the type species K. massiliensis. Proposed in 2017, but not validly published.
- Lagierella, with the type species L. massiliensis. The genus has been proposed twice, in 2016 and 2021, based on the same isolate.
- Micromonas, first proposed in 1981 with the species Micromonas pusilla, but not validly published. Again proposed in 2000 with the new combination Micromonas micros as type species, but ruled illegitimate due to the algal genus Micromonas. M. micros is now validly published as Parvimonas micra.
- Schleiferella, proposed in 2001 as genus for several new combinations, all of which are now validly published in Peptoniphilus.
- Urinacoccus and Urinicoccus, with the type species U. massiliensis. The genus has been proposed twice, in 2016 and 2019, based on the same isolate.

== Phylogeny ==
The currently accepted taxonomy is based on the List of Prokaryotic names with Standing in Nomenclature (LPSN) and National Center for Biotechnology Information (NCBI)

16S rRNA based LTP_10_2024

- Peptoniphilaceae
  - - - Parvimonas
      - - - Citroniella Patel et al. 2019
          - Finegoldia
        - - Gallicola
          - - Mediannikoviicoccus
            - Miniphocaeibacter
    - - - - Kallipyga
          - Murdochiella
        - Helcococcus
      - Anaerococcus
  - - - Fenollaria
      - Ezakiella
    - - Aedoeadaptatus
      - Peptoniphilus

120 marker proteins based GTDB 09-RS220

- Peptoniphilaceae
  - - - Fenollaria Pagnier et al. 2018
      - Ezakiella Patel et al. 2015
    - - "Neofamilia" Lagier et al. 2016
      - - - "Urinicoccus" Yimagou et al. 2019
          - Aedoeadaptatus Hitch et al. 2022
        - Peptoniphilus Ezaki et al. 2001
  - - - Parvimonas Tindall & Euzéby 2006
      - - Finegoldia Murdoch & Shah 2000
        - - Gallicola Ezaki et al. 2001
          - - Mediannikoviicoccus Ly et al. 2023
            - Miniphocaeibacter corrig. Bilen et al. 2021
    - - - Helcococcus Collins et al. 1993
        - - "Ndongobacter" Brahimi et al. 2017
          - - - "Khoudiadiopia" Diop et al. 2017
              - Kallipyga Hugon et al. 2016
            - Murdochiella Ulger-Toprak et al. 2010
      - Anaerococcus Ezaki et al. 2001
