= Cetobacterium somerae =

Scientific classification
- Domain: Bacteria
- Kingdom: Fusobacteriati
- Phylum: Fusobacteriota
- Class: Fusobacteriia
- Order: Fusobacteriales
- Family: Fusobacteriaceae
- Genus: Cetobacterium
- Species: C. somerae

Binomial name
- Cetobacterium somerae Finegold et al. 2003

Type strain
- ATCC BAA-474, CCUG 46254, WAL 14325

Synonyms
- Cetobacterium someriae

Species of bacterium

Cetobacterium somerae is a microaerotolerant, Gram-negative, and rod-shaped anaerobic bacteria found in the gastrointestinal tract of fish living in freshwater ecosystems. The bacteria is also immobile and non-spore forming. C. somerae was first isolated from the feces of children with Autism spectrum disorder. Members of bacteria within the Cetobacterium genus tend to dominate the microbiota of fish in freshwater ecosystems. Cetobacterium somerae also produces vitamin B-12 within the gastrointestinal tract of fish in order to provide nutritional support for growth.

== Taxonomy ==
Cetobacterium somerae traces from a unique lineage. The taxonomic classification is as follows: Bacteria, Fusobacteriota, Fusobacteriia, Fusobacteriales, Fusobacteriaceae, Cetobacterium, and lastly, Cetobacterium somerae. The closest species is Cetobacterium ceti, the only other species within the genus Cetobacterium. The sequence similarity shared with Cetobacteium ceti is 98%. Leptotrichia buccalis, Sebaldella termitidis, Sneathia sanguinegens, Streptobacillus moniliformis, Propionigenium species, Ilyobacter species, and Fusobacterium species were among the other species that shared phylogenetic relationships with Cetobacterium somerae. Of these, Fusobacterium species has the most sequence similarity for the whole genome, at 93%, while Sneathia sanguinegens has the lowest, at 82%.

== Discovery ==
=== Isolation ===
From 2000 to 2002, in the VA Medical Center West Los Angeles and UCLA School of Medicine, a team of researchers led by Sydney M. Finegold discovered the species Cetobacterium somerae. At Rush Children's Hospital in Chicago, two children between 47-51 months old with late-onset autism who were given oral vancomycin medication had four strains of an unknown gram-negative, rod-shaped bacterium extracted from their feces. Phenotypic characterization including biochemical tests, cellular fatty acid analysis, and antibiotic susceptibility testing was performed on the isolates by Finegold's team. To dilute the stool samples, they were combined under anaerobic circumstances with peptone broth. Plates of diluted samples were placed on different media and incubated with particular gas conditions. Standard tests and commercial systems were used to evaluate biochemical parameters and measure bile sensitivity. Acid production and substrate utilization were investigated. Cellular fatty acids and DNA G + C concentration were examined for chemotaxonomy in species identification. Using 16S rRNA gene sequencing, database searches, and relatedness-based tree construction were all part of the phylogenetic analysis process. An evaluation of the groupings' stability was conducted using maximum parsimony and bootstrap analysis (Finegold et al., 2003). Both maximum parsimony and bootstrap analyses are performed specifically for examining phylogenetic trees. Maximum parsimony is an approach to minimize the number of evolutionary steps required to allot data onto branches of a phylogenetic tree. On the other hand, bootstrap analyses are a method to determine the confidence intervals for a phylogenetic tree. 16S rRNA gene sequencing and phylogenetic analysis showed the isolates represented a novel species within the genus Cetobacterium, distinct from but closely related to Cetobacterium ceti. Based on the phenotypic and phylogenetic evidence, the researchers proposed in 2003 to classify the new bacterium as Cetobacterium somerae, naming the type strain WAL 14325T.

=== Characterization ===
Cetobacterium somerae is also found to be in the intestinal tracts of freshwater fish. In 2008, a group of researchers from Japan used fishing sampling locations such as the Fisheries Research Laboratory of the Saitama Prefectural Agriculture and Forestry Research Center to isolate anaerobic bacteria from the intestine contents of various freshwater fishes like goldfish, tilapia, catfish, common carp and grass carp. Standard anaerobic culture techniques on various media like Fusobacterium modified agar, Bacteroides agar and fradiomycin-Clostridium welchii agar were used. Phenotypic characterization such as biochemical tests, fermentation products, G+C content, and 16S rRNA gene sequencing were used to identify the microbial strains. They identified these previous "Bacteroides type A" isolates as actually being Cetobacterium somerae based on their analyses.

== Metabolism ==
In 2023, a published study recorded the first bacteremia case involving Cetobacterium somerae for necrotizing cholecystitis, a condition concerning the inflammation of the gallbladder, in a human patient. The study describes that Cetobacterium somerae cannot grow in the presence of oxygen and relies on anaerobic respiration. Through the fermentation of carbohydrates, it yields large amounts of acetate and only trace amounts of propionate and butyrate. It has been proposed to increase fish's intestinal consumption of carbohydrates by producing acetate. It can synthesize vitamin B12, which could "promote fish health".

== Ecology ==
There are two types of bacteria species within the genus of Cetobacterium: Cetobacterium ceti and Cetobacterium somerae. In 2014, an experiment was conducted in order to determine the importance of microorganisms on the gut health of various fish species. Both of the C. ceti and C. somerae bacterial species used in the study are found in abundance in the guts of several different warmwater fish species that are deemed economically valuable in the aquaculture industry. However, analyses of the gut flora of the fish using 16s rRNA sequencing established that the C. somerae bacterial species was the most prevalent microorganism in all of the fish species even though the microbial gut distribution of the fish samples all varied greatly in abundance. C. somerae makes up 70% of the gut bacteria of several freshwater fish species, including tilapia, bass, bluegill, and carp. It's not known to cause infections in fish, but it seems to be a potentially mutualistic bacteria in fish intestines.

== Genomics ==
The Cetobacterium somerae currently has three strains being isolated: ATCC BAA-474, MGYG-HGUT-01458, and CS2105-BJ. However only the CS2105-BJ has a finished sequence as computed by the IMG (Integrated Microbial Genome) dataset. The whole genome of the CS2105-BJ strain Cetobacterium somerae bacteria was sequenced in 2023 and has a size of 2.97 Mb. 28.83% of the total nucleotides are G+C base pairs as sequenced by the PacBio sequencing technology. The strain has 2901 total genes and 94.35% of the total genes code for the production of proteins. 1.55% of the total gene count serves as regulatory proteins to assist in gene expression. According to the KEGG (Kyoto Encyclopedia of Genes and Genomes) database, the bacterial strain has a circular chromosome and contains six plasmids.

Analysis of the genome using Illumina sequencing technology showed that the Cetobacterium somerae contains no pathogenic potential to cause disease in host organisms such as fish due to a lack of toxins and adhesins that will allow the bacteria to infect a host. However, in 2023, the first human infection of C. somerae infection was identified via 16s rRNA gene sequencing. The introduction of 16s rRNA gene sequencing has provided a culture-independent method of identifying microorganisms. In the past, it was difficult to isolate obligate anaerobic bacteria due to their need for an anoxic environment. The current pathogenicity of C. somerae in human hosts is therefore uncertain and research is further being conducted to interpret the mechanisms.

== Scientific advancement ==
The Cetobacterium somerae bacteria has potential benefits and implications in the health of fish species. Namely, C. somerae fermentation products can potentially replace fish meal as an adjuvant with plant protein for fish food. Scientists have also long considered plant proteins as an alternative source to fish meal due to sustainability issues associated with fish meal. Fish meal production yields an abundance of phosphorus, which contributes to anoxic environments via algal blooms that can kill fish. However, despite the fact that plant-based fish food is considered more sustainable, its usage is cautioned because plant proteins have been shown to negatively affect fish metabolism via antinutritional factors, which restrict nutrient uptake and induce metabolic inhibition. However, the fermentation product of the C. somerae is a potential source of supplemental fish feed that can mitigate the inhibitory effects of plant proteins and therefore reduces toxic effects from antinutritional factors in fish species consuming plant protein within aquatic ecosystems. For example, a study on carp fish contrasting finely ground plant proteins, or uPPs (ultra-processed proteins), in comparison to the fermentation product of a C. somerae bacterial strain showed that the uPPs contributed to increased inflammation and an increase of liver enzymes that contribute to fatty liver disease in the carp fish. However, utilizing the uPPs in conjunction with the fermentation product of the C. somerae bacteria reduced the amount of inflammation and fatty liver disease, showing that the C. somerae fermentation product offsets the negative effects of the plant proteins.

=== Applications ===
The effects of Cetobacterium somerae as an alleviating agent has been further studied in carp hepatotoxicity induced from pesticides. For example, the pesticide trichlorfon has been shown to heighten enzymatic activity that contributes to liver disease in carp fish and also negatively alters the microflora in the carp's gut. Astragalus polysaccharides, a polysaccharide derived from the Astragalus propinquus plant has shown to have synergistic effects when used in combination with Cetobacterium somerae. The pair mitigates hepatotoxicity caused by trichloron by reducing fat synthesis and regulating gut microbiota of the carp fish.

The scientific advancement of Cetobacterium somerae on human health has recently been found as a potential source of a biomarker for colorectal cancer. The prevalence of certain bacterial organisms in the human gut may be used as a source of a noninvasive biomarker for the presence of colorectal cancer. This is helpful because the more invasive detectors of colorectal cancer via colonoscopy can be economically disadvantageous for certain populations. For example, the simultaneous presence of the bacterial species Prevotella copri, Gemella morbillorum, Parvimonas micra, Cetobacterium somerae, and Pasteurella stomatis in the gut microbiota is a strong predictor of colorectal cancer.
