= List of bacterial vaginosis microbiota =

Bacterial vaginosis is caused by an imbalance of the naturally occurring bacteria in the vagina. The normally predominant species of Lactobacilli are markedly reduced. This is the list of organisms that are found in the vagina that are associated with bacterial vaginosis, an infectious disease of the vagina caused by excessive growth of specific bacteria. The census and relationships among the microbiota are altered in BV, resulting in a complex bacterial milieu. Some species have been identified relatively recently. Having infections with the listed pathogens increases the risk of acquiring other sexually transmitted infections including HIV/AIDS.

== Microbiota ==
- Actinobacteria spp
- Actinomyces naeslundii
- Aggregatibacter actinomycetemcomitans
- Anaerococcus spp
- Atopobium vaginae
- Bacteroides ureolyticus
- Bifidobacterium spp
- Clostridiales spp
- Collinsella aerofaciens
- Eggerthella lenta
- Eggerthella spp
- Eubacterium spp
- Fusobacterium nucleatum
- Gardnerella vaginalis
- Leptotrichia amnionii
- Leptotrichia spp
- Megasphaera spp
- Mobiluncus spp
- Mycoplasma hominis
- Mycoplasma parvum
- Peptococcus spp
- Peptoniphilus spp
- Peptostreptococcus anaerobius
- Peptostreptococcus spp
- Porphyromonas gingivalis
- Prevotella bivia spp
- Prevotella disiens
- Prevotella intermedia
- Slackia spp
- Sneathia sanguinegens
- Streptococcus viridans
- Tannerella forsythia
- Treponema denticola
- Ureaplasma urealyticum
- Veillonella parvula
