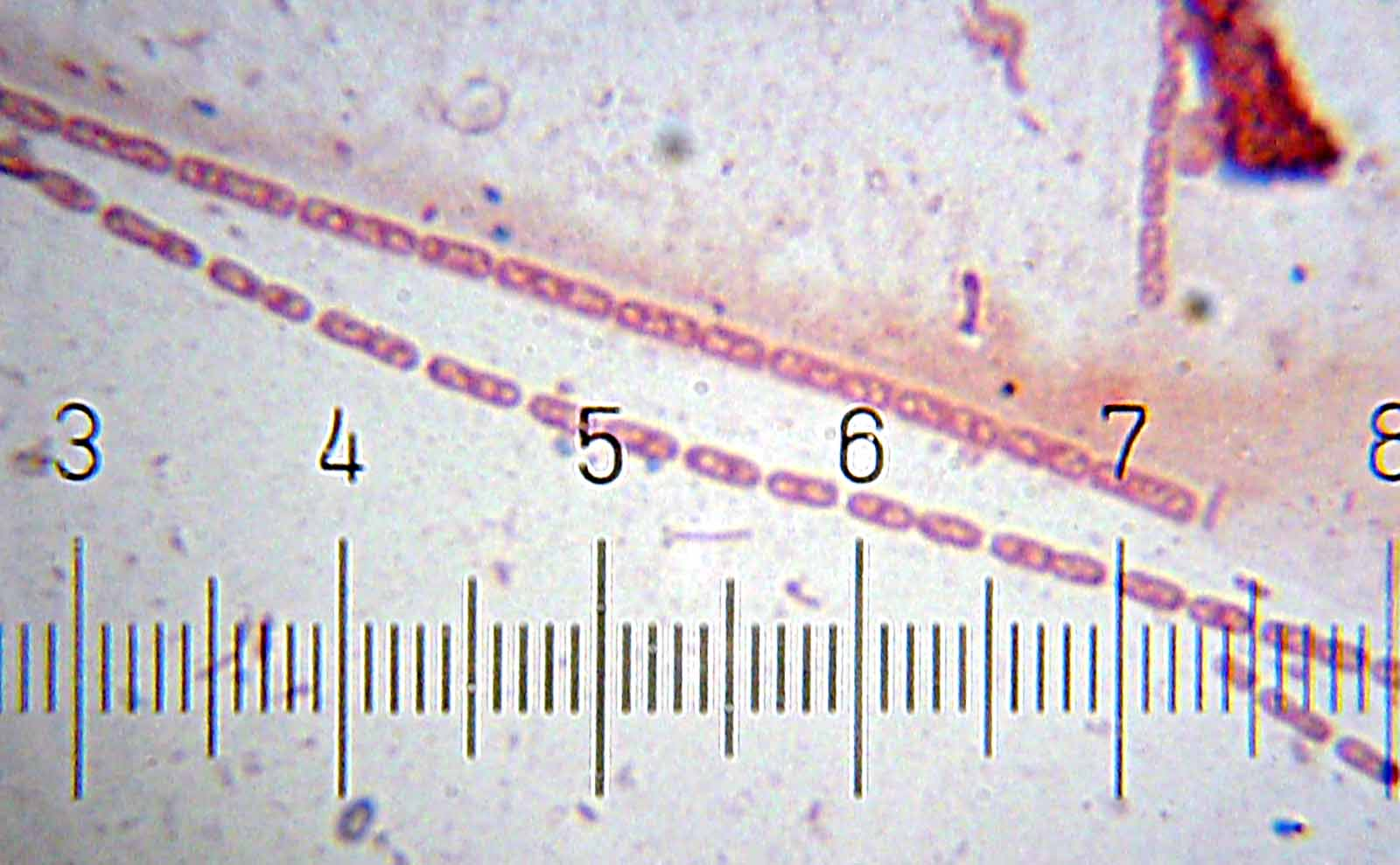
- Streptobacillus; Numbered ticks are 11 µm apart

Scientific classification
- Domain: Bacteria
- Kingdom: Fusobacteriati
- Phylum: Fusobacteriota
- Class: Fusobacteriia
- Order: Fusobacteriales
- Family: Leptotrichiaceae
- Genus: Streptobacillus; Levaditi, Nicolau & Poincloux 1925

Type species
- Streptobacillus moniliformis Levaditi, Nicolau & Poincloux 1925

Species
- S. canis; S. felis; S. moniliformis; S. notomytis; S. ratti

Synonyms
- "Bactepneumonia" Tulasne & Brisou 1955; "Haverhillia" Parker & Hudson 1926

= Streptobacillus =

Genus of bacteria

Streptobacillus is a genus of fastidious microaerophilic Gram-negative bacteria, which grow in culture as rods in chains.

Their species associated with infection is S. moniliformis.

Their reported susceptibilities and therapies are penicillin and erythromycin.

== Diseases ==
Associated infections: the Haverhill fever form of rat bite fever. (Notes Spirillum minus is also an agent of rat bite fever, in the form known as Sodoku.)

Haverhill fever, which is characterized by fever, rash, chills, headache, vomiting, muscle pain, arthritis, and bacteremia, and by weight loss and diarrhea in children.

== Commentary ==
Rat bite fever is caused by either Streptobacillus moniliformis or Spirillum minor. The incidence of rat-bite fever is highest in urban areas with poor sanitation where the rat population is high, however in recent times cases have also been attributed to occupational contact with rodents such as pet shop employees or laboratory workers or through pet ownership.

While the disease is usually caused by a bite, it can also occur from close contact with rodents or ingestion of contaminated food or water. The latter is known as Haverhill fever. The disease typically presents with chills and fever accompanied by headache, vomiting, and muscle pain. A rash and arthritis develop 2–4 days after the initial onset. Less commonly the infection can cause pneumonitis, endocarditis or meningitis. As these symptoms are common to many febrile diseases, this is often classified as a fever of unknown origin (FUO). If untreated, death will occur in approximately 10% of cases.

== Phylogeny ==
The currently accepted taxonomy is based on the List of Prokaryotic names with Standing in Nomenclature (LPSN) and National Center for Biotechnology Information (NCBI)

16S rRNA based LTP_10_2024

- Streptobacillus
  - S. canis
  - - S. felis
    - - S. ratti
      - - S. moniliformis
        - S. notomytis

120 marker proteins based GTDB 10-RS226

- Streptobacillus
  - S. felis Eisenberg et al. 2015
  - - S. canis Eisenberg et al. 2020
    - - S. notomytis Eisenberg et al. 2015
      - - S. moniliformis Levaditi, Nicolau & Poincloux 1925
        - S. ratti Eisenberg et al. 2015

== See also ==
- List of bacterial orders
- List of bacteria genera
