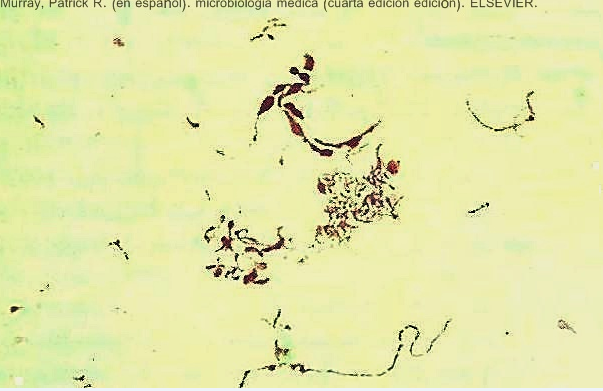

Scientific classification
- Domain: Bacteria
- Kingdom: Fusobacteriati
- Phylum: Fusobacteriota
- Class: Fusobacteriia
- Order: Fusobacteriales
- Family: Leptotrichiaceae
- Genus: Streptobacillus
- Species: S. moniliformis

Binomial name
- Streptobacillus moniliformis Levaditi et al. 1925

= Streptobacillus moniliformis =

Species of bacterium

Streptobacillus moniliformis is a non-motile, Gram-negative rod-shaped bacterium that is a member of the family Leptotrichiaceae. The genome of S. moniliformis is one of two completed sequences of the order Fusobacteriales.

== Etymology ==
Its genus name comes from the Ancient Greek word στρεπτός : streptós for "curved" or "twisted", and the Latin word bacillus meaning "small rod." The specific name moniliformis means "necklace like". S. moniliformis is microaerophilic, requiring less oxygen than is present in the atmosphere for its growth.

== Background ==
=== History ===
S. moniliformis was first isolated from a rat-bitten man in 1914 by German microbiologist H. Schottmüller, who described it as Streptothrix muris ratti. In the United States during the year 1916, S. moniliformis was determined to be the causative source of rat-bite fever.

=== Microbiology ===
Some isolates of S. moniliformis have been collected from the upper respiratory tract of domestic and wild rats. Two known variants of S. moniliformis have been identified. The bacillary type is pathogenic. In contrast, the spontaneously occurring L-form, which lacks a cell wall and whose colonies grow in a "fried egg" formation, is non-pathogenic.

== Morphology ==
The bacterium S. moniliformis is a gram-negative pleomorphic rod occurring frequently in chains and tangled filaments with bulbous or Monilia-like swellings. The organism presents phenotypically as being facultatively anaerobic, non-motile, weakly ferments glucose and maltose, is catalase and oxidase-negative, does not reduce nitrate, and exhibits no growth on MacConkey agar. Morphologically, colonies of S. moniliformis are 1–2 mm in size, smooth, convex, non-hemolytic (varied presentation with an α-hemolysis is not uncommon) and gray in color. When cultured in broth, a typical "puff-ball" appearance is seen.

== Taxonomy ==
Streptobacillus moniliformis was previously classified under the family Fusobacteriaceae. It was later regrouped with three other genera: Sebaldella, Sneathia, and Leptotrichia. These four genera were classified under the family Leptotrichiaceae following comparative analyses of the 16S ribosomal RNA gene sequences and 16S-23S rDNA internal transcribed spacer sequences among members of the phylum Fusobacteria. Identification of conserved signature indels unique to Fusobacteria and its primary clades as well as phylogenetic analysis of members of Fusobacteria based on concatenated sequences of 17 conserved proteins further support the distinction between the two families.

S. moniliformis was formerly classified as the only member of the genus Streptobacillus. However, Streptobacillus strains HKU33T and HKU34 were isolated in Hong Kong in September 2014. Streptobacillus HKU33T was found in pus isolated from the abscess of a 38-year-old patient with quinsy and HKU34 from the elbow joint fluid of a 64-year-old patient with septic arthritis. Following analysis of the 16S rRNA gene sequences found in members of Leptotrichiaceae and partial sequences of the recA, groEl, and gyrB genes present in both isolates, the two strains were taxonomically grouped under the novel species Streptobacillus hongkongensis sp. nov.

== Genomics ==
The U.S. Department of Energy's Joint Genome Institute (DOE JGI) sequenced the complete genome of S. moniliformis DSM 12112. It is made up of one circular chromosome of 1,673,280 base pairs as determined from a combination of Sanger and 454 sequencing. The mol% of guanine and cytosine in the DNA is 26.3% with 1,511 protein coding genes out of the 1,566 genes predicted. These low G+C values were previously only seen in members of the order Mycoplasmatales, which includes the genus Mycoplasma, indicating a relationship between Mycoplasma and S. moniliformis. However, 16S rRNA gene analysis showed this relation to be incorrect. S. moniliformis also has a single circular plasmid pSMON01 that is 10,702 base pairs long with 1,511 protein coding genes.

== Isolation and identification ==
The fastidious nature of Streptobacillus moniliformis makes it difficult to culture, with current published recommendations stating it requires media supplemented with 20% serum, ascitic fluid, or whole blood in order to grow. Numerous published reports also state that the organism is inhibited by the polyanionic detergent sodium polyanethole sulfonate (SPS-trade name; Liquoid; Hoffman-La Roche, Inc., Nutley, N.J.), the main anticoagulant in modern commercially available blood culture bottles, used in automated continuous blood culture instruments.

Optimizing the best chances for organism recovery should include the aseptic collection of blood or sterile body fluids into commercial blood culture bottles (documenting the amount of blood drawn from the patient, if applicable) during the acute phase of infection, and collected in duplicate with optimal volumes of inoculation for the isolation and growth of S. moniliformis being 10 ml for adolescent to adult patients. In a pediatric population, 4–5 ml should be extrapolated. Bottles should be incubated minimally for 7 days to ensure the best chance for organism recovery when working with low levels of bacteremia. If not yet detected by day 7, they should be blind sub-cultured to rule out a false-negative blood culture result. Automated continuous blood culturing instrumentation growth and fluorescent detection data should be checked manually during the course of incubation in order to rule out missed false-negative samples.

Once a bottle shows signs of organism growth and detection, a Gram stain should be performed followed by inoculation of blood onto rabbit or sheep blood agar and brain heart infusion broth and incubated aerobically at 35 °C, 35–37 °C, or 5% CO_{2} enriched (microaerophilic) environment for a minimum of 3–4 days.

While the organism has been reported to be inhibited by specific blood culture additives, specifically SPS in the clinical lab, current research has proposed methods to overcome this limitation with "100% culture, growth success rates". According to Szewc et al., their research into the "reported" fastidious nature of S. moniliformis, and its inhibition by the anticoagulant SPS showed, that when using a specific volume of blood for inoculum, it resulted in 100% recovery and successful growth of this organism and appeared to overcome the inhibitions and limitations that historically have been observed when using SPS for blood culturing and recovering S. moniliformis in a clinical setting.

== Relevance ==
=== Rat bite fever and Haverhill fever ===
In the U.S., rat bite fever is primarily caused by transmission of S. moniliformis from the bite of a rat. However, approximately 30% of patients diagnosed with rat bite fever do not recall being scratched or bitten by an infected animal. Transmission of the bacterium is also known to occur via consumption of infected water, close contact with, or handling of rats. Haverhill fever, named after the 1926 outbreak of the disease in Haverhill, Massachusetts, is a form of rat bite fever that can result from ingesting food contaminated with S. moniliformis. In 1986 at a boarding school in the United Kingdom, another outbreak of Haverhill fever was reported. Some 304 people were reported to have been afflicted. Infection was suspected to have resulted from the consumption of either unpasteurized milk or water contaminated with rat feces. Infected individuals described symptoms including a sudden development of vomiting, severe headache, and cold sweats with a high fever. Parker and Hudson first isolated the cause of this outbreak, which they named Haverhilia multiformis. This organism was later matched to S. moniliformis after further research.

Symptoms of rate bite fever include the abrupt onset of fever ranging from 38 °C to 41 °C. Approximately 75% of infected individuals develop a rash in addition to hemorrhaging vesicles. Both the rash and vesicles are usually located on the hands and feet, although the rash has been known to spread to other parts of the body.

The microaerophilic nature of S. moniliformis makes identification difficult. PCR testing is being utilized more for its identification. However, there is still a 13% mortality rate for untreated cases. Immunocompromised individuals, such as HIV-positive individuals, are more at risk of death from this disease. Lab personnel and pet store workers, who work closely with animals on a daily basis, also have an increased risk of infection.

Although S. moniliformis is believed to be part of the commensal bacteria of the respiratory tract of rats, rats have occasionally shown signs of the disease. Antibiotics used to treat infection may cause the formation of the L-form, which persists in the body, although this form is not pathogenic.
