= Fusobacterium polymorphum =

Scientific classification
- Domain: Bacteria
- Kingdom: Fusobacteriati
- Phylum: Fusobacteriota
- Class: Fusobacteriia
- Order: Fusobacteriales
- Family: Fusobacteriaceae
- Genus: Fusobacterium
- Species: F. nucleatum

Binomial name
- Fusobacterium nucleatum Knorr, 1922

Subspecies
- F. polymorphum

Fusobacterium polymorphum is a subspecies strain of the anaerobic, Gram-negative bacterium, Fusobacterium nucleatum. Originally, it was isolated from the plaque samples of individuals diagnosed with periodontitis and has been phylogenetically identified as its own distinct sub-group, separate from its previously studied sister strains. Research studies have also linked this subspecies to human diseases, such as fatal sepsis and inflammatory periodontal disease.

== Taxonomy and Phylogeny ==
Fusobacterium polymorphum is a subspecies of Fusobacterium nucleatum, which is a member of the phylum Fusobacteriota and family Fusobacteriaceae. Having originally been grouped together with Bacteroides, as well as other Gram-negative anaerobes, advances in genetic analysis have made it clear that Fusobacterium are actually phylogenetically closer in relation to organisms such as those of the genus Leptotrichia. Additionally, with the complete genome sequencing of the core species, F. nucleatum, it has been discovered that approximately 35-56% of Fusobacterium genes likely have been acquired from Bacteroidetes, Proteobacteria, Spirochaetes, and Firmicutes, as a result of horizontal gene transfer. More specifically, further analysis has led to suggestions that the genes responsible for coding Fusobacterium's Gram-negative cell wall, may have origins tracing back to Proteobacteria.

=== Sister Strains ===
Through the employment of both evolutionary and phylogenetic analysis, it has been discovered that there are currently five subspecies of F. nucleatum that are recognized by modern science's taxonomic standards: nucleatum, vincentii, fusiforme, animalis, and polymorphum. These sister subspecies, through the aid of previously conducted DNA sequencing efforts, have been found to possess unique differences in their genetic makeup, as well as a number of rearrangements among their protein coding genes. While the exact roles that each subspecies plays in the oral microbiome are yet to be fully studied in depth, it is known that they each contribute to the development of human infectious diseases and are some of the first Gram-negative microorganisms to arise in the formation of dental plaque.

== Discovery ==
=== History ===
The initial discovery of F. nucleatum came close to 70 years prior to the distinction of its subspecies strains. It was not until work from Dzink, Sheenan, and Scransky that the first three subspecies, one of which was F. polymorphum, were initially proposed.

=== Isolation ===
Strains were originally obtained through plaque samples collected from individuals diagnosed with periodontitis. From these plaque samples, isolates of F. nucleatum were selected for further investigation and subjected to Polyacrylamide Gel Electrophoresis (PAGE) for the separation and analysis of extracted soluble proteins. Following the cultivation and collection of sample cells, DNA was pretreated with 200 μg of lysozyme per ml and extracted through methods proposed by Smith et al., in 1989. This genetic material was fragmented and subsequently denatured through means of heating at 99 °C. Renaturation rates, the rates at which this previously denatured genetic material was refolded, were then monitored and recorded through the use of a spectrophotometer, and homology percentages were calculated on the basis of these renaturation rates.

=== Classification ===
DNA-DNA hybridization was conducted between five cultures from the American Type Culture Collection (ATCC) and seven isolates, with certain strains being selected for based on the findings of the hybridizations and guidelines outlined by Hartford and Sneath in 1988. The following strains were selected: EM48, ATCC 25586, and ATCC 10953. DNA was then collected from 137 additional isolates, compared with each of these three strains, and then assigned to a homology group on the basis of highest similarity. It was found that the strain ATCC 10953 was evidently distinguishable enough from the other strains, hence, leading to its classification as F. nucleatum ssp. polymorphum.

== Physiology ==
F. polymorphum, like all other subspecies of F. nucleatum, is a bacillus-shaped, Gram-negative anaerobic microbe. It has been found that optimum growth for F. polymorphum is at around a pH of 7.4, with a generation time of 3.5 hours. However, it was discovered that this optimum growth rate was only applicable in cultures that were limited in glucose, histidine, and serine.

=== Metabolism ===
In order to thrive in anaerobic environments, F. polymorphum, along with its sister subspecies, have evolved metabolic pathways that do not require oxygen. This microbe does this through fermentation, where it breaks down a variety of organic compounds into ATP and a range of end-products, including acetate, butyrate, and ammonia. F. polymorphum feeds off of its host's nutritional consumption and begins its fermentation process by undergoing glycolysis to produce pyruvate, in order to metabolize the sugars consumed for the fulfillment of its energy production needs. From here, in the absence of oxygen, pyruvate is able to be fermented and converted into various end products, along with the regeneration of NAD+, which allows for glycolysis to continue and, thus, a constant production of ATP.

=== Adaptive Mechanisms ===
Additionally, F. polymorphum is a non-spore forming bacterium, meaning it is unable to produce spores for survival under harsh environmental conditions. Instead, this microbe is capable of biofilm formation, often in conjunction with a number of other microbes, in order to protect itself from environmental stressors and enabling it to survive in the gastrointestinal tract of humans. In the case that F. polymorphum is exposed to increased levels of oxidative stress, it has been discovered that this microbe is able to respond and maintain a reduced state through the increased activity levels of certain enzymes, NADH oxidase and superoxide dismutase, thus protecting its cellular units from oxidative damage.

== Ecology ==
Fusobacterium polymorphum, along with its sister subspecies, is readily found within the plaque of human teeth, as well as within periodontal pockets, being one of the many bacteria within the oral microbiota involved in the inflammation of the gums. On top of this, F. polymorphum has also been found to inhabit areas of the gastrointestinal tract, making it closely associated with intestinal inflammation and inflammatory bowel disease. Nonetheless, in most instances, the mere presence of F. polymorphum within the human body is harmless and does not always lead to the development of disease, as it is an organism that has been commonly found in the mouths of healthy individuals. There is the possibility of this strain becoming opportunistic in certain microbial environments, which could potentially result in its increased proliferation and eventual progression towards a number of systemic diseases.

== Genomics ==
Genome sequencing has revealed that F. nucleatum ssp. polymorphum (FNP) has about 2.4 million base pairs in its individual chromosome and 11,934 base pairs in its plasmid, making it about 300 thousand base pairs larger than its sister strain F. nucleatum ssp. nucleatum (FNN), which has a genome consisting of approximately 2.1 million base pairs. When comparing F. polymorphum's genome with those of other subspecies, it was found that about 38% of its base pairs were either completely unique to F. polymorphum or shared by only one of the two other subspecies' genomes being studied. This is indicative of F. polymorphum's genetic uniqueness and suggests that it may possess certain characteristic differences than its sister subspecies, particularly in terms of its pathogenic properties. For instance, research found 132 predicted proteins that contributed to Fusobacterium's virulence, most of which, however, were found in the subspecies nucleatum and vincentii. In the case of F. polymorphum specifically, a few notably identified proteins included a VacJ homolog (FNP_0314), which has demonstrated high involvement in the transmission of Shigella flexneri within cells, MviN (FNP_1360), which is associated with the pathogenicity of Salmonella typhimurium, and VacB (FNP_1921), which is a ribonuclease that promotes the activation of virulent genes in Shigella flexneri.

== Applications and Future Research ==
Further research into the subspecies, Fusobacterium polymorphum, is critical in nature, because of the health issues Fusobacterium nucleatum has been known to cause. For starters, it is well known that F. nucleatum is a prominent microbe that contributes to the occurrence of periodontitis, an infection of the gums. On top of this, it has been found that F. nucleatum has been able to travel across the human body and begin to inhabit different variants of tissue, potentially leading to the development of diseases, such as atherosclerosis, diabetes, and a wide variety of respiratory conditions. Given that there are a total of 5 subspecies within F. nucleatum, it is currently unclear whether there is a single specific subspecies that is primarily contributing to all of these disease-related complications, or if each subspecies contributes to its own set of systemic diseases. Therefore, further studying of this organism of interest, Fusobacterium polymorphum, would better allow for researchers to attain a better understanding for identifying and establishing specific linkages between our selected subspecies and the plethora of health issues that arise from the general species it falls under. Moreover, this increase in research would potentially enable scientists to discover new methods for reducing the growth and proliferation of this microbe through perhaps new means of oral hygiene, for instance, before further development causes any severe damage to the human body.
