= Propionigenium modestum =

Scientific classification
- Domain: Bacteria
- Kingdom: Fusobacteriati
- Phylum: Fusobacteriota
- Class: Fusobacteriia
- Order: Fusobacteriales
- Family: Fusobacteriaceae
- Genus: Propionigenium
- Species: P. modestum

Binomial name
- Propionigenium modestum Schink and Pfennig 1983

Species of bacterium

Propionigenium modestum is a species of gram-negative, strictly anaerobic bacteria. It is rod-shaped and around 0.5-0.6 x 0.5-2.0μm in size. It is important in the elucidation of mechanism of ATP synthase.

== Etymology ==
The word propionigenium comes from the Latin word acidum propionicum meaning propionic acid and genre is Latin for make or produce. Modestus comes from the Latin word meaning modest, referring to an extremely modest type of metabolism.

== Taxonomic Information ==
Propionigenium modestum's current classification is Bacteria, Fusobacteria, Fusobacteria, Fusobacteriales, Fusobacteriaceae, Propionigenium, Modestum. Propionigenium modestum and Propionigenium maris, currently, are the only two species belonging to the genus Propionigenium. They both inhabit marine environments. P. modestum was found to be more closely related to Ilyobacter insuetus than it is to P. maris. P. modestum and I. insuetus share 97±4 - 98±5% 16S rRNA (ribosomal Ribonucleic Acid), while P. modestum and P. maris only share 96±5 - 96±8%. Only two species in the family Fusobacteriaceae have had their entire genomes sequenced; one being llyobacter polytropus.

== Discovery ==
P. modestum was isolated by Bernhard Schink and Norbert Pfenning in 1982. It was first isolated from black, anaerobic mud from Canale Grande in Venice, Italy, and was later isolated from human saliva. The original isolation of P. modestum was obtained through a succinate media, which was used as the primary source of energy. It was reported that for every mol of succinate that was fermented by P. modesetum, there was between 2.1 and 2.4 grams of cell dry weight isolated from the media.

== Characteristics ==
P. modestum is a non-sporing and non-motile bacteria. Its growth optimum is pH of 7.1-7.7 and a temperature of 33 °C. The G+C content is 33.9%. It utilizes succinate, fumarate, malate, aspartate, oxaloacetate, and pyruvate for growth and fermentes them to propionate, (acetate), and carbon dioxide (CO_{2}). This organism grows optimally in fresh and saltwater, as well as human saliva under anaerobic conditions. Propionigenium modestum converts succinate (as well as other energy sources) to propionate to generate energy. The conversion has a small free energy change so there is no electron-transport chain or substrate-linked phosphorylation.

== Importance ==
F-type ATPases (Adenylpyrophosphatase ) typically use protons as the sole coupling ion, but the F_{1}F_{0} ATPase of Propionigenium modestum is the first discovered which uses sodium ions (Na^{+}).

The discovery of the ATPase in P. modestum is important because it demonstrated that the chemiosmosis theory as proposed by Peter D. Mitchell was incorrect. Mitchell proposed that the H^{+} was consumed in the synthesis of ATP by reacting directly with O_{2} converting it to H_{2}O while producing ATP from ADP. Instead the F-type ATPase of P. modestum uses only Na^{+} to drive the reaction, demonstrating the production of H_{2}O from O_{2} during the synthesis of ATP does not consume the H^{+} used by all other known F-type ATPases. Thus demonstrating that it is the H^{+} gradient that drives ATP synthase.

== Activity ==
The ATPase of P. modestum acts about 6 times higher than bacterial membranes, at 6.6 units/mg of protein. The ATPase is composed of subunits a, b, and c. It has been found that subunit c is extremely stable and does not dissociate during SDS (Sodium Dodecyl Sulfate) gel electrophoresis until 120 °C.
