= Ilyobacter insuetus =

Scientific classification
- Domain: Bacteria
- Kingdom: Fusobacteriati
- Phylum: Fusobacteriota
- Class: Fusobacteriia
- Order: Fusobacteriales
- Family: Fusobacteriaceae
- Genus: Ilyobacter
- Species: I. insuetus

Binomial name
- Ilyobacter insuetus Brune et al. 2002

Type strain
- ATCC BAA-291, DSM 6831, strain VenChi2

Species of bacterium

Ilyobacter insuetus is a mesophilic and anaerobic bacterium from the genus Ilyobacter which has been isolated from marine anoxic sediments from Venice in Italy.
