= Ilyobacter delafieldii =

Scientific classification
- Domain: Bacteria
- Kingdom: Fusobacteriati
- Phylum: Fusobacteriota
- Class: Fusobacteriia
- Order: Fusobacteriales
- Family: Fusobacteriaceae
- Genus: Ilyobacter
- Species: I. delafieldii

Binomial name
- Ilyobacter delafieldii Janssen and Harfoot 1991

Species of bacterium

Ilyobacter delafieldii is a motile, gram-negative, obligately anaerobic rod-shaped bacteria, with type strain 10cr1 (=DSM 5704). It is notable for metabolising beta-Hydroxybutyric acid.
