= Leptotrichia trevisanii =

Scientific classification
- Domain: Bacteria
- Kingdom: Fusobacteriati
- Phylum: Fusobacteriota
- Class: Fusobacteriia
- Order: Fusobacteriales
- Family: Leptotrichiaceae
- Genus: Leptotrichia
- Species: L. trevisanii

Binomial name
- Leptotrichia trevisanii Tee et al. 2002

Type strain
- ATCC 700907, DSM 22070, strain Wee Tee 1999, LB06, LB11

Species of bacterium

Leptotrichia trevisanii is an aerotolerant, filamentous and non-motile bacterium from the genus of Leptotrichia which has been isolated from human blood.
