= Fusobacterium mortiferum =

Scientific classification
- Domain: Bacteria
- Kingdom: Fusobacteriati
- Phylum: Fusobacteriota
- Class: Fusobacteriia
- Order: Fusobacteriales
- Family: Fusobacteriaceae
- Genus: Fusobacterium
- Species: F. mortiferum

Binomial name
- Fusobacterium mortiferum (Harris 1901) Moore and Holdeman 1970

Synonyms
- Bacillus mortiferus Harris 1901; Clostridium rectum (Heller 1922) Holdeman and Moore 1972; Hiblerillus rectus Heller 1922

Species of bacterium

Fusobacterium mortiferum is species of anaerobic, gram-negative bacterium in the family Fusobacteriaceae.
