= Enorma timonensis =

Scientific classification
- Domain: Bacteria
- Kingdom: Bacillati
- Phylum: Actinomycetota
- Class: Coriobacteriia
- Order: Coriobacteriales
- Family: Coriobacteriaceae
- Genus: Enorma
- Species: E. timonensis

Binomial name
- Enorma timonensis Ramasamy et al. 2016

Type strain
- CSUR P900, DSM 26111, strain GD5

Species of bacterium

Enorma timonensis is a Gram-positive, rod-shaped, non-endospore-forming and non-motile bacterium from the genus of Enorma which has been isolated from human feces.
