= Cetobacterium ceti =

Scientific classification
- Domain: Bacteria
- Kingdom: Fusobacteriati
- Phylum: Fusobacteriota
- Class: Fusobacteriia
- Order: Fusobacteriales
- Family: Fusobacteriaceae
- Genus: Cetobacterium
- Species: C. ceti

Binomial name
- Cetobacterium ceti Foster et al. 1996

Type strain
- ATCC 700028, NCFB 3026, NCIMB 703026, strain M-3333

Species of bacterium

Cetobacterium ceti is a Gram-negative, and rod-shaped obligately anaerobic bacterium from the genus Cetobacterium which has been isolated from sea mammals. Cetobacterium ceti represents a hitherto unknown line of descent peripherally associated to the fusobacteria and low G + C relatives. There is no growth of Cetobacterium ceti at 25°C or 45°C.
