= Collinsella massiliensis =

Scientific classification
- Domain: Bacteria
- Kingdom: Bacillati
- Phylum: Actinomycetota
- Class: Coriobacteriia
- Order: Coriobacteriales
- Family: Coriobacteriaceae
- Genus: Collinsella
- Species: C. massiliensis

Binomial name
- Collinsella massiliensis Padmanabhan et al. 2016

Type strain
- DSM 26110, GD3

Species of bacterium

Collinsella massiliensis is a Gram-positive, obligatory anaerobic, non-spore-forming, rod shaped and non-motile bacterium from the genus of Collinsella which has been isolated from human feces from the Timone Hospital in France.
