= Maltose-6'-phosphate glucosidase =

Class of enzymes

maltose-6′-phosphate glucosidase

Identifiers
- EC no.: 3.2.1.122
- CAS no.: 98445-08-0

Databases
- BRENDA: enzyme data
- ExPASy: NiceZyme view
- KEGG: enzyme entry
- MetaCyc: metabolic pathway
- Rhea: reactions
- PDB structures: RCSB PDB PDBe PDBsum
- Gene Ontology: AmiGO / QuickGO
Search
- PMC: articles
- PubMed: articles
- NCBI: proteins

The enzyme maltose-6′-phosphate glucosidase (EC 3.2.1.122) catalyzes the following chemical reaction:

maltose 6'-phosphate
H_{2}O
glucose 6-phosphate
+
D-glucose

The enzyme characterised from Fusobacterium mortiferum hydrolyses maltose 6'-phosphate to glucose 6-phosphate and D-glucose. The enzyme also hydrolyses other 6-phospho-α-D-glucosides. A process to produce tyrosine has been developed which involves optimising this and other enzymes by metabolic engineering.

It belongs to the family of hydrolases, specifically those glycosidases that hydrolyse O- and S-glycosyl compounds. It participates in starch and sucrose metabolism.

== Nomenclature ==
The systematic name of this enzyme class is maltose-6′-phosphate 6-phosphoglucohydrolase. This enzyme is also called phospho-α-glucosidase.

== Structural studies ==
As of late 2007, only one structure has been solved for this class of enzymes, with the PDB accession code PDB: 1U8X.
