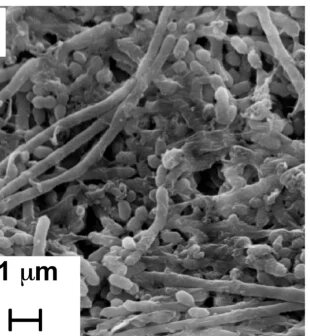

Scientific classification
- Domain: Bacteria
- Kingdom: Fusobacteriati
- Phylum: Fusobacteriota
- Class: Fusobacteriia
- Order: Fusobacteriales
- Family: Leptotrichiaceae
- Genus: Sneathia
- Species: S. amnii

Binomial name
- Sneathia amnii (Shukla et al. 2002) Harwich et al. 2012

Type strain
- AMN-1, strain Sn35

Synonyms
- Leptotrichia amnionii

= Sneathia amnii =

Species of bacterium

Sneathia amnii is a bacterium from the genus of Sneathia which has been isolated from human blood from Strasbourg in France. Sneathia amnii is a pathogen of the female urogenital tract.
