= Collinsella intestinalis =

Scientific classification
- Domain: Bacteria
- Kingdom: Bacillati
- Phylum: Actinomycetota
- Class: Coriobacteriia
- Order: Coriobacteriales
- Family: Coriobacteriaceae
- Genus: Collinsella
- Species: C. intestinalis

Binomial name
- Collinsella intestinalis Kageyama and Benno 2000

Type strain
- CCUG 45296, CIP 106914, DSM 13280, JCM 10643, RCA 56-68

Species of bacterium

Collinsella intestinalis is a Gram-positive and anaerobic bacterium from the genus of Collinsella which has been isolated from human feces in Japan Collinsella intestinalis occur in the human intestine.
