= Collinsella stercoris =

Scientific classification
- Domain: Bacteria
- Kingdom: Bacillati
- Phylum: Actinomycetota
- Class: Coriobacteriia
- Order: Coriobacteriales
- Family: Coriobacteriaceae
- Genus: Collinsella
- Species: C. stercoris

Binomial name
- Collinsella stercoris Kageyama and Benno 2000

Type strain
- CCUG 45295, CIP 106913, DSM 13279, JCM 10641, RCA 55-54

Species of bacterium

Collinsella stercoris is a Gram-positive and anaerobic bacterium from the genus of Collinsella which has been isolated from human feces in Japan.
