= Leptotrichia buccalis =

Scientific classification
- Domain: Bacteria
- Kingdom: Fusobacteriati
- Phylum: Fusobacteriota
- Class: Fusobacteriia
- Order: Fusobacteriales
- Family: Leptotrichiaceae
- Genus: Leptotrichia
- Species: L. buccalis

Binomial name
- Leptotrichia buccalis (Robin 1853) Trevisan 1879 (Approved Lists 1980)

Species of bacterium

Leptotrichia buccalis is an anaerobic, Gram-negative rod bacteria. It is a constituent of normal oral flora.

== Morphology ==
Leptotrichia species are typically large, fusiform-shaped, non-sporulating, and non-motile rods.

== Pathology ==
Almost every case of severe infection with Leptotrichia buccalis reported in medical literature occurred in patients with neutropenia.
