= Enorma massiliensis =

Scientific classification
- Domain: Bacteria
- Kingdom: Bacillati
- Phylum: Actinomycetota
- Class: Coriobacteriia
- Order: Coriobacteriales
- Family: Coriobacteriaceae
- Genus: Enorma
- Species: E. massiliensis

Binomial name
- Enorma massiliensis Mishra et al. 2016

Type strain
- CSUR P183, DSM 25476, strain phI

Synonyms
- Obesia massiliensis

Species of bacterium

Enorma massiliensis is a Gram-positive and obligately anaerobic bacterium from the genus of Enorma which has been isolated from human feces from Marseille in France.
