= Collinsella tanakaei =

Scientific classification
- Domain: Bacteria
- Kingdom: Bacillati
- Phylum: Actinomycetota
- Class: Coriobacteriia
- Order: Coriobacteriales
- Family: Coriobacteriaceae
- Genus: Collinsella
- Species: C. tanakaei

Binomial name
- Collinsella tanakaei Nagai et al. 2010

Type strain
- DSM 22478, JCM 16071, YIT 12063

Species of bacterium

Collinsella tanakaei is a Gram-positive, strictly anaerobic, non-spore-forming and rod-shaped bacterium from the genus of Collinsella which has been isolated from human faeces from Tokyo in Japan.
