= Corio-PBP RNA motif =

Conserved RNA structure

Corio-PBP
- Consensus secondary structure and sequence conservation of Corio-PBP RNA

Identifiers
- Symbol: Corio-PBP
- Rfam: RF02945

Other data
- RNA type: Gene; sRNA
- SO: SO:0001263
- PDB structures: PDBe

The Corio-PBP RNA motif is a conserved RNA structure that was discovered by bioinformatics. Corio-PBP motifs are found in Coriobacteriaceae, which is a lineage of Actinomycetota.

It is ambiguous whether Corio-PBP RNAs function as cis-regulatory elements or whether they operate in trans. Corio-PBP RNAs are often located upstream of genes encoding periplasmic-binding protein transporters. However, the substrate specificity of these transporters has not been determined.
