= Soduku =

Soduku can be

- a common misspelling of Sudoku, a logic-based number placement puzzle
- a possible misspelling of Sodoku, a bacterial zoonotic disease
- an alternate name for the carrom ball in cricket.
