= Pseudoleptotrichia =

Scientific classification
- Domain: Bacteria
- Kingdom: Fusobacteriati
- Phylum: Fusobacteriota
- Class: Fusobacteriia
- Order: Fusobacteriales
- Family: Leptotrichiaceae
- Genus: Pseudoleptotrichia; Eisenberg et al. 2020
- Species: P. goodfellowii

Binomial name
- Pseudoleptotrichia goodfellowii (Eribe et al. 2004) Eisenberg et al. 2020

Type strain
- CCUG 32286, CIP 107915, DSM 19756, JCM 16774, strain LB 57

Synonyms
- Leptotrichia goodfellowii Eribe et al. 2004

Species of bacterium

Pseudoleptotrichia goodfellowii is a Gram-negative, non-spore-forming, non-motile anaerobic bacterium and the sole species of the genus Pseudoleptotrichia (previously classified as Leptotrichia goodfellowii). It was isolated from the human blood of an endocarditis patient. It is associated with infections in the oral cavity and respiratory tract. Although related species within the former genus Leptotrichia are known human pathogens, Pseudoleptotrichia goodfellowii now stands apart as a monotypic taxon, with its precise pathogenic mechanisms and clinical significance still under investigation.

== Basic information ==
Pseudoleptotrichia goodfellowii is an anaerobic, non-spore forming, gram-negative bacillus. Initially isolated from blood on blood agar at 37 °C, it was characterized by Gram staining and microscopy. Although rare, it is recognized as a human pathogen primarily in immunocompromised patients and can cause endocarditis, an inflammation of the heart chambers and valves. While other species of the previously broader genus Leptotrichia are common in infections such as bite wounds and bloodstream infections, P. goodfellowii has been segregated into its own monotypic genus due to its distinct genetic profile.

== Etymology ==
In 1683, Antonie Van Leeuwehhoek first discovered bacteria later grouped in the genus Leptotrichia. The species Pseudoleptotrichia goodfellowii was named in honor of Mike Goodfellow for his significant contributions to microbial systematics.

== Reclassification ==
After 16S rRNA gene sequence analysis, researchers found that Leptotrichia goodfellowii was phylogenetically distinct from other Leptotrichia species. Eisenberg et al. proposed reclassifying it into its own, monotypic genus, Pseudoleptotrichia, in 2020.

== Taxonomy and phylogeny ==
Within the family Leptotrichiaceae, Pseudoleptotrichia is currently monotypic, containing only Pseudoleptotrichia goodfellowii. Other genera within the family include Streptobacillus, Sneathia, Sebaldella, and Leptotrichia. Phylogenetic analyses confirm that P. goodfellowii is distinct from its former congeners, supporting its reclassification.

== Genomics ==
Pseudoleptotrichia goodfellowii is challenging to sequence using conventional methods, so molecular detection via 16S rDNA PCR followed by Sanger sequencing is preferred. Its genome is approximately 2.28 Mb in size, with 2,199 genes and 2,079 proteins. Genomic analysis by Lieberman et al. applied a species-level identification threshold of ~99.6%–99.7% similarity; no other species reached this level, with the next closest being canine oral Leptotrichia spp (87.81%–89.57%).

== Ecology ==
Members of the former genus Leptotrichia are common in bacterial biofilms, particularly within the human oral cavity. P. goodfellowii has been isolated from the human oropharynx and blood, as well as from various sources such as guinea pig oral swabs, gastric fluid associated with stillbirth cases, and secretions from a healthy patient’s dog bite wound.

== Metabolism ==
Pseudoleptotrichia goodfellowii is an anaerobic chemoheterotroph and mesophilic, growing optimally at 37 °C. Like its former congeners in Leptotrichia, it ferments carbohydrates such as glucose, maltitol, maltose, and lactose to produce lactic acid. A distinguishing trait of P. goodfellowii is its ability to metabolize sucrose isomers, a property not common among other oral bacteria. The presence of a phosphoenolpyruvate:carbohydrate phosphotransferase (PEP-PTS) operon—observed in related species like L. buccalis—is likely shared by P. goodfellowii.

== Pathology ==
Molecular methods are essential for detecting P. goodfellowii, though challenges such as poor or contaminated DNA quality may complicate diagnosis. In one case study, a 66-year-old woman with culture-negative endocarditis was ultimately diagnosed by 16S Sanger sequencing after amplicon sequencing clarified the pathogen as P. goodfellowii. The recommended treatment for endocarditis caused by this organism is β-lactam antibiotics. Unfortunately, in the referenced case, the rapid progression of the disease led to the patient's death.
