= Sneathia sanguinegens =

Scientific classification
- Domain: Bacteria
- Kingdom: Fusobacteriati
- Phylum: Fusobacteriota
- Class: Fusobacteriia
- Order: Fusobacteriales
- Family: Leptotrichiaceae
- Genus: Sneathia
- Species: S. sanguinegens

Binomial name
- Sneathia sanguinegens (Hanff et al. 1995) Collins et al. 2002

Type strain
- CCUG 41628, CIP 106906, DSM 22970

Synonyms
- Leptotrichia microbii, Leptotrichia sanguinegens

Species of bacterium

Sneathia sanguinegens is a Gram-positive and anaerobic bacterium from the genus of Sneathia which has been isolated from humans.
