= Susan Bullman =

Irish immunologist and oncologist

- Born: County Cork, Ireland
- Education: University College Cork; Cork Institute of Technology
- Awards: Irish Research Council High Commendation, Early Career Researcher (2021); Time 100 Next (2025)
- Scientific career
- Fields: Immunology, Oncology
- Workplaces: MD Anderson Cancer Center

Susan Bullman is an Irish immunologist and oncologist who has been an associate professor at both the Departments of Immunology and Gastrointestinal Medical Oncology at the University of Texas MD Anderson Cancer Center since May 2024. Her research focuses on how the digestive tract microbiome affects the development of oral and colorectal cancer. She was named to the Time 100 Next in 2025 for her research.

== Biography ==
Bullman was born and raised in County Cork, Ireland and attended University College Cork for her B.Sc. in Biomedical Science. She then went to the Cork Institute of Technology for her PhD, where she met her husband: they met through being the most studious of their class and both staying in the lab late.

During her PhD, she focused on how bacteria contribute to gastrointestinal diseases, but upon learning of recent scientific discoveries regarding how bacteria can affect cancer, she decided to focus on that field. She moved to Boston with her husband, and took a position as a post-doctoral researcher at the Dana–Farber Cancer Institute, where she became known for her research on Fusobacterium nucleatum's links to colorectal cancer.

She then began work as an associate professor at the Fred Hutchinson Cancer Center, where she ran her own independent research group. She has since become a professor in both the Immunology and Gastrointestinal Medical Oncology departments at the MD Anderson Cancer Center.

Bullman's research has found Fusobacterium nucleatum causes cancers to go into a dormant state called Quiescence, reducing the effectiveness of chemotherapy, which focuses on handling rapidly dividing cells, and increasing the likeliness of relapse. She has also found that the bacteria can travel with colon cancer cells as it metastasizes in the liver. Notably, she has also found that targeting and eradicating F. nucleatum suppresses tumor growth.

Bullman has recommended eating fiber-rich foods to reduce the risk of developing colorectal cancer and oral cancer by promoting beneficial gut bacteria.

She was named a Stat Wunderkind in 2018 and was given the High Commendation, Early Career Researcher award by the Irish Research Council in 2021. She received a Keck Foundation award in 2021 to research if and how certain bacteria directly alter the human genome and cause cancer. She was named to the 40 under 40 in Cancer in 2025. In 2025, Bullman received the Gianni Bonadonna Prize from the Fondazione Gianni Bonadonna for her contributions to cancer research.She was named to the Time 100 Next in 2025: her profile was written by Matthew Meyerson.
