= Collinsella =

Scientific classification
- Domain: Bacteria
- Kingdom: Bacillati
- Phylum: Actinomycetota
- Class: Coriobacteriia
- Order: Coriobacteriales
- Family: Coriobacteriaceae
- Genus: Collinsella; Kageyama, Benno & Nakase 1999

Type species
- Collinsella aerofaciens (Eggerth 1935) Kageyama, Benno & Nakase 1999

Species
- See text

Genus of bacteria

Collinsella is a genus of Actinomycetota, in the family Coriobacteriaceae. Collinsella is named after the microbiologist Matthew D. Collins.

== Phylogeny ==
The currently accepted taxonomy is based on the List of Prokaryotic names with Standing in Nomenclature (LPSN) and National Center for Biotechnology Information (NCBI).

16S rRNA based LTP_10_2024

- Collinsella
  - C. tanakaei
  - - - C. ihumii
      - C. massiliensis Padmanabhan et al. 2016
    - - C. aerofaciens
      - - C. vaginalis
        - - C. intestinalis
          - C. stercoris

120 marker proteins based GTDB 10-RS226

- Collinsella
  - - C. aerofaciens (Eggerth 1935) Kageyama, Benno & Nakase 1999
    - "C. bouchesdurhonensis" Bilen et al. 2017
  - - - C. ihumii Ben Khedher et al. 2022
      - "Ca. C. stercoripullorum" Gilroy et al. 2021
    - - "C. phocaeensis" Ndongo et al. 2017
      - - - C. tanakaei Nagai, Watanabe & Morotomi 2010
          - - C. urealytica corrig. Oh et al. 2024
            - C. vaginalis Diop et al. 2019
        - - "C. provencensis" Dione et al. 2018
          - - C. intestinalis Kageyama & Benno 2000
            - C. stercoris Kageyama & Benno 2000

Unassigned species:

- "C. acetigenes" Han et al. 2024
- "C. avium" Wongkuna et al. 2021
