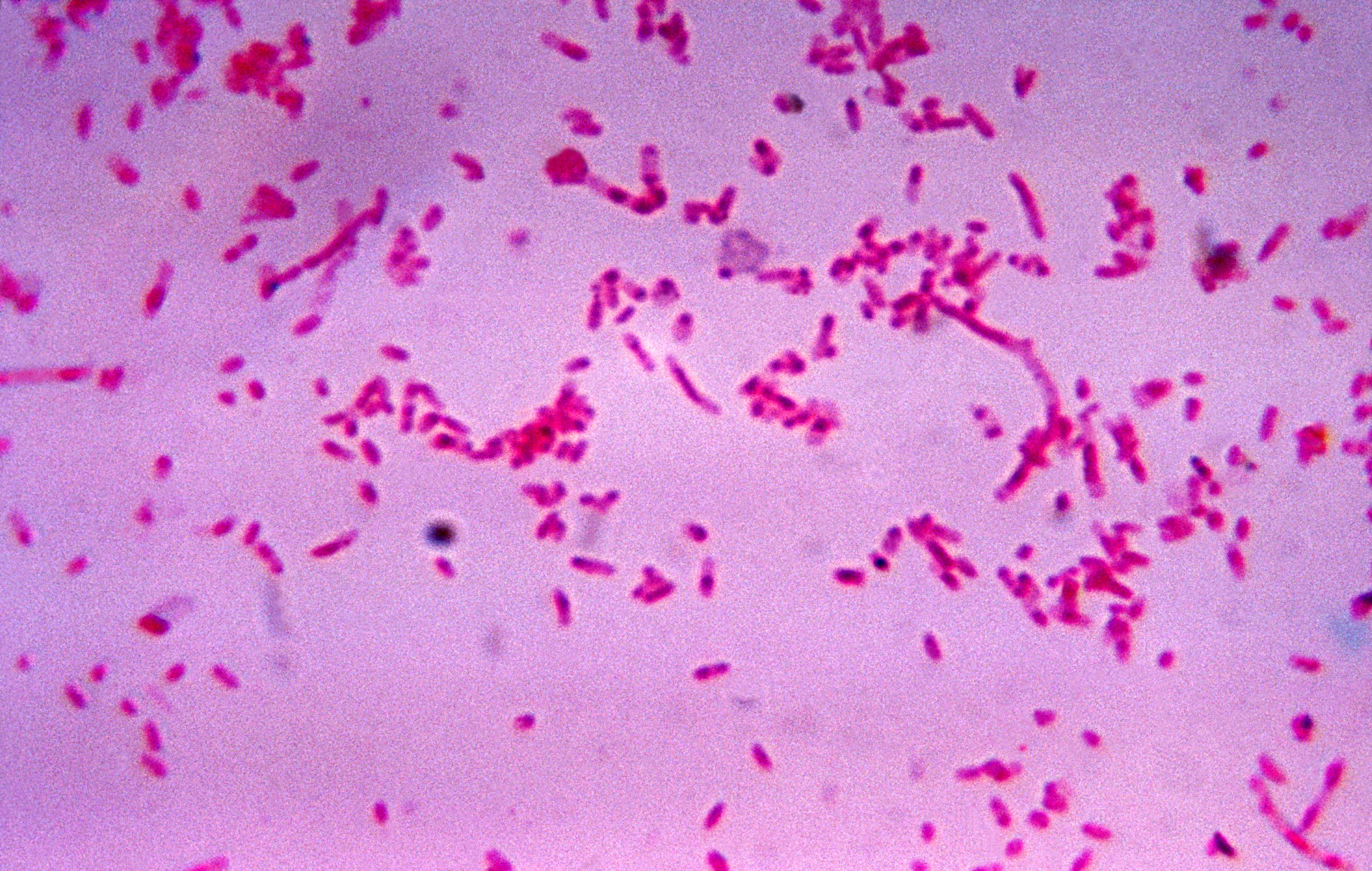
- Fusobacterium novum in liquid culture

Scientific classification
- Domain: Bacteria
- Kingdom: Fusobacteriati
- Phylum: Fusobacteriota
- Class: Fusobacteriia
- Order: Fusobacteriales
- Family: Fusobacteriaceae
- Genus: Fusobacterium; Knorr 1923

Type species
- Fusobacterium nucleatum Knorr 1923

Species
- See text

Synonyms
- "Distasoa" Pribram 1929; "Necrobacterium" Lahelle & Thjotta 1945; "Sphaerocillus" corrig. Prévot 1938; "Sphaerophorus" Prévot 1938 non Persoon 1794 non Gray 1864 non Waltl 1835

= Fusobacterium =

Genus of bacteria

Fusobacterium is a genus of obligate anaerobic, Gram-negative, non-sporeforming bacteria belonging to Gracilicutes. Individual cells are slender, rod-shaped bacilli with pointed ends. Fusobacterium was discovered in 1900 by Courmont and Cade and is common in the flora of humans.

Strains of Fusobacterium can cause several human diseases and infections, including periodontal diseases, Lemierre's syndrome, oral, head, and neck infections, as well as colorectal cancer and topical skin ulcers.

It has been tied to HIV infection and suboptimal immune recovery. Detection of Fusobacterium is typically through surgical retrieval of tissue, fecal tests, or blood tests in patients showing symptoms. Early detection is preferred and helps to prevent further disease progression.

Although older sources state that Fusobacterium is part of the normal flora of the human oropharynx, the current consensus is that Fusobacterium should always be treated as a pathogen. There are thirteen described Fusobacterium strains; the predominant one affecting humans is F. nucleatum, followed by F. necrophorum, which also affects animals, mainly cattle.

== Background ==
=== History ===
Although the genus was not discovered until 1900 by Courmont and Cade, the first documented Fusobacterium infection was reported in 1898 by Veillon and Zuber, who described a case of systemic infection in a young child. The genus was proposed by Knorr in 1923. Fusobacterium has been classically considered a normal part of the human oral, gastrointestinal, and female genital flora, which is why infections are not commonly seen.

== Clinical relevance ==
Fusobacterium is often associated with ulcerative colitis. Research of colon cancer has also shown an overrepresentation of Fusobacterium, both in feces of patients and tumor tissue itself. Fusobacterium has also been seen increased in individuals infected with HIV as well as in individuals with suboptimal immune recovery as compared to patients who were not infected and had optimal responses.

=== Prevalent pathogenic species ===
F. nucleatum is found in humans more so than any other species of Fusobacterium. It is commonly found in the oral cavity as well as in the intestinal tract. Some of its pathogenic ties include its extraction from amniotic fluid sourced from spontaneous premature labor without reason/a given source. A few additional sources of its pathogenic nature include its association with oral inflammation diseases, cancers such as pancreatic, oral, and colorectal, as well as infections of the head and neck. This association is due to the high increase in the prevalence of F. nucleatum in those infected areas. F. nucleatum can worsen or initiate colorectal cancer by stimulating other bacteria such as Streptococcus, Campylobacter spp. and Leptotrichia as well as cancerous gene expression from Beta-catenin signaling. F. nucleatum can be detected in tissues, genomic DNA, and feces using methods such as (FQ, q, and dd) polymerase chain reaction and fluorescence in situ hybridization. However, these are limited because tissues can only be tested after surgery and fecal matter can return false positive results.

F. necrophorum has been found as a common pathogen in the diagnostic of peritonsillar abscess and is more prevalent than other bacteria regarding this infection. It is also the most frequent leading cause associated with Lemierre Syndrome and is not proven to be a normal part of the human oral bacterium population. F. necrophorum commonly infects animals, causing liver abscesses and necrotic diseases, and can combine with other pathogenic bacteria to cause various infections such as foot rot and uterine infections.

=== Sources of other species of Fusobacterium ===
- F. ulcerans is very similar to F. varium and is commonly extracted from tropical ulcers.
- F. necrogenes is also closely related to F. ulcerans and F. varium and has been found in chickens and ducks.
- F. perfoetans is sourced from fecal matter. (F. perfoetans and F. necrogenes have not been sourced from any infections in humans or animals)
- F. gonidiaformans is typically found in the intestines of humans and is not found orally like the other Fusobacterium.
- F. russi is a common bacteria in canine and feline oral cavities and can lead to the infection of puncture wounds if transferred to humans from bites.
- F. simae which can be sourced from monkeys.

=== Symptoms and treatment ===
Fusobacterium infections often cause clinical symptoms such as a fever, inflammation, and a diseased appearance. Further diagnosis can confirm suspicions of Fusobacterium infection through blood testing or culturing the tissue. Upon diagnosing the infection, action to treat it involves the application of antibiotics over a 2-week period which could be in the form of penicillin or other variants as well as using anaerobic antibiotics like clindamycin and metronidazole which work when the Fusobacterium can break down the Beta-lactams. Leaving Fusobacterium untreated could lead to more severe developments of the infection and early testing is recommended. By testing early, fatal diseases such as Lemierre syndrome can be avoided. However, this requires the family physician to be conscious of the danger as infections such as Lemierre syndrome affects younger populations and especially those of male gender. The bacterium is a big anchor for biofilms. It is usually susceptible to clindamycin, while approximately 20% of the clinical strains are resistant to penicillin. In contrast to Bacteroides spp., Fusobacterium has a potent lipopolysaccharide.

== Taxonomy ==
=== Current species ===
Fusobacterium is divided into 13 different species, two of which each have their own set of subspecies (F. nucleatum and F. necrophorum).

=== Reclassified species ===
Other previously declared species of Fusobacterium such as F. symbiosum, F. praecutum, F. plauti, F. alocis, F. sulci, and F. prausnitzii have since been reclassified due to containing different characteristics from the other Fusobacterium members. F. alocis has been reclassified into Filifactor alocis while F. sulci has been reclassified as Eubacterium sulci. F. prausnitzii is a part of the Clostridium leptum subgroup under Eubacterium-like organisms. A few strains F. prausnitzii, a gut commensal associated with healthy patients, was completely reclassified as Faecalibacterium (Clostridiales:Ruminococcaceae) in 2002.

=== Phylogenic tree ===
16S rRNA based LTP_10_2024

- - Cetobacterium
  - - Fusobacterium
      - F. perfoetens
      - - - F. hominis Liu et al. 2022
          - - F. mortiferum
            - F. necrogenes
        - - - F. ulcerans
            - F. varium
          - - - F. gonidiaformans
              - - F. equinum Dorsch et al. 2001
                - - F. necrophorum
                    - F. n. funduliforme Hallé 1898 ex Shinjo et al. 1991
                    - F. n. necrophorum (Flügge 1886) Shinjo et al. 1991
            - - - F. gastrosuis
                - F. russii
              - - F. periodonticum
                - - F. polymorphum
                  - - F. canifelinum
                    - - - F. watanabei Tomida et al. 2021
                        - - F. naviforme (Jungano 1909) Moore & Holdeman 1970
                          - F. vincentii
                      - - F. nucleatum
                        - - F. simiae
                          - - Filifactor alocis (Cato et al. 1985) Jalava and Eerola 1999
                            - F. animalis

120 marker proteins based GTDB 10-RS226

- - Fusobacterium perfoetens (Tissier 1905) Moore and Holdeman 1973
  - - Cetobacterium
    - Fusobacterium
      - - - F. ulcerans Adriaans and Shah 1988
          - F. varium (Eggerth and Gagnon 1933) Moore and Holdeman 1969
        - - F. hominis Liu et al. 2022
          - - "Ca. F. pullicola" Gilroy et al. 2021
            - - F. mortiferum (Harris 1901) Moore and Holdeman 1970
              - F. necrogenes (Weinberg et al. 1937) Moore and Holdeman 1970
      - - - F. gonidiaformans (Tunnicliff and Jackson 1925) Moore and Holdeman 1970
          - F. necrophorum (Flügge 1886) Shinjo et al. 1991
        - - - F. gastrosuis De Witte et al. 2017
            - F. russii (Hauduroy et al. 1937) Moore and Holdeman 1970
          - - "F. massiliense" Mailhe et al. 2017
            - - - F. periodonticum Slots et al. 1984
                - "F. pseudoperiodonticum" Park et al. 2019
              - - F. nucleatum Knorr 1922 (type sp.)
                - - - F. polymorphum (Dzink, Sheenan & Socransky 1990) Kook et al. 2022
                    - - F. canifelinum corrig. Conrads et al. 2004
                      - "F. hwasookii" Cho et al. 2014
                  - - F. vincentii (Dzink, Sheenan & Socransky 1990) Kook et al. 2022
                    - - F. animalis (Gharbia & Shah 1992) Kook et al. 2022
                      - F. simiae Slots & Potts 1982

Unassigned Fusobacterium:

- "F. paranimalis" Sivertsen et al. 2025

== See also ==
- Altered Schaedler flora
- List of bacteria genera
- List of bacterial orders
