= Enorma =

Scientific classification
- Domain: Bacteria
- Kingdom: Bacillati
- Phylum: Actinomycetota
- Class: Coriobacteriia
- Order: Coriobacteriales
- Family: Coriobacteriaceae
- Genus: Enorma; Mishra et al. 2016

Type species
- Enorma massiliensis Mishra et al. 2016

Species
- "E. burkinafasonensis"; E. massiliensis; "E. phocaeensis"; E. shizhengliae; E. timonensis

Genus of bacteria

Enorma is a genus of bacteria from the family of Coriobacteriaceae.

== Phylogeny ==
The currently accepted taxonomy is based on the List of Prokaryotic names with Standing in Nomenclature (LPSN) and National Center for Biotechnology Information (NCBI).

16S rRNA based LTP_10_2024

- Enorma
  - E. timonensis
  - - E. massiliensis
    - E. shizhengliae

120 marker proteins based GTDB 10-RS226

- Enorma
  - - E. massiliensis Mishra et al. 2016 [incl. E. shizhengliae Ge et al. 2021]
    - E. timonensis Ramasamy et al. 2016
  - - "E. burkinafasonensis" Gouba et al. 2020
    - "E. phocaeensis" Ndongo et al. 2017
