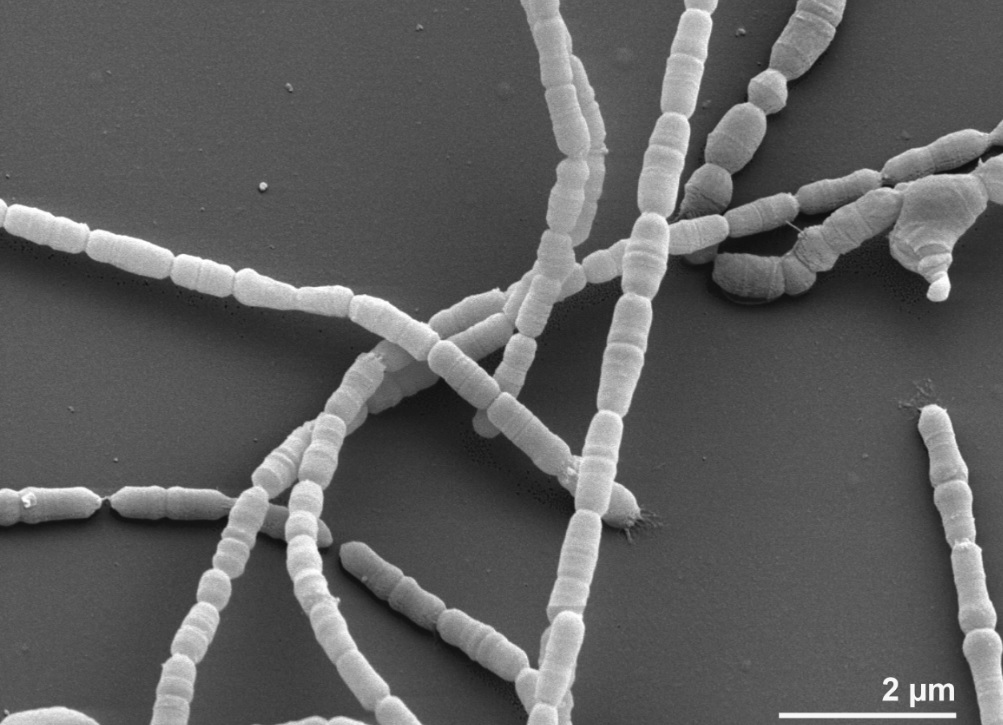
- An image of Coriobacterium glomerans, the only known species of Coriobacterium, taken using an electron microscope

Scientific classification
- Domain: Bacteria
- Kingdom: Bacillati
- Phylum: Actinomycetota
- Class: Coriobacteriia
- Order: Coriobacteriales
- Family: Coriobacteriaceae
- Genus: Coriobacterium; Haas and König 1988

Type species
- Coriobacterium glomerans Haas & König 1988

Species
- C. glomerans

= Coriobacterium =

Genus of bacteria

Coriobacterium is a genus of Actinomycetota, in the family Coriobacteriaceae. Coriobacterium are non-motile, Gram-positive, non-sporulating rods, which inhabit the gastrointestinal tract of firebugs (Pyrrhocoris apterus). Up to now there is only one species of this genus known (Coriobacterium glomerans).
