= Collinsella aerofaciens =

Scientific classification
- Domain: Bacteria
- Kingdom: Bacillati
- Phylum: Actinomycetota
- Class: Coriobacteriia
- Order: Coriobacteriales
- Family: Coriobacteriaceae
- Genus: Collinsella
- Species: C. aerofaciens

Binomial name
- Collinsella aerofaciens (Eggerth 1935) Kageyama et al. 1999

Human gut microbe

Collinsella aerofaciens is a species of obligately anaerobic, non-motile, gram-positive bacterium found in the human gut. It is capable of fermenting carbohydrates and sugars to produce hydrogen gas, ethanol, formate and lactate. The bacterium has a circular genome 2,428,218bp long containing 2079 protein-encoding sequences. The bacterium is the most common actinobacterium in the healthy human gut.

Collinsella aerofaciens has been noted as having been commonly found in the gut microbiome of patients suffering from severe COVID-19 infections. In addition, C. aerofaciens has been used as a marker of response to probiotic treatment in some types of irritable bowel syndrome.
