= Haliovirgaceae =

Scientific classification
- Domain: Bacteria
- Kingdom: Fusobacteriati
- Phylum: Fusobacteriota
- Class: Fusobacteriia
- Order: Fusobacteriales
- Family: Haliovirgaceae; Miyazaki et al. 2023

Genus
- Haliovirga

Family of gram-negative bacteria

Haliovirgaceae is a family of bacteria in the order Fusobacteriales. The family contains one genus: Haliovirga. Bacteria in this family are gram-negative, mesophilic, anerobic, and sulfur-reducing.
