= Fusobacterium nucleatum =

Scientific classification
- Domain: Bacteria
- Kingdom: Fusobacteriati
- Phylum: Fusobacteriota
- Class: Fusobacteriia
- Order: Fusobacteriales
- Family: Fusobacteriaceae
- Genus: Fusobacterium
- Species: F. nucleatum

Binomial name
- Fusobacterium nucleatum Knorr, 1922

Species of bacterium

Fusobacterium nucleatum is a Gram-negative, anaerobic bacterium, commensal to the human oral cavity, that plays a role in periodontal disease. This organism is commonly recovered from different monocultured microbial and mixed infections in humans and animals. In health and disease, it is a key component of periodontal plaque due to its abundance and its ability to coaggregate with other bacteria species in the oral cavity.

== Preterm births ==
Research implicates periodontal disease caused by F. nucleatum with preterm births in humans. In many studies, F. nucleatum cells have been isolated from the amniotic fluid, placenta, and chorioamnionic membranes of women delivering prematurely. Moreover, laboratory mice intravenously inoculated with F. nucleatum have been found to deliver prematurely, and the pathology of the infection seems to mirror observations in humans. Together, this research provides evidence for a possible causal connection between F. nucleatum-caused periodontal disease and at least some cases of preterm delivery. F. nucleatum can also be isolated from the vaginal microbiome, especially in women with a condition known as bacterial vaginosis. Both F. nucleatum vaginal colonization and bacterial vaginosis also have been linked with preterm birth and infections within the uterus. Thus, preterm birth arising by infections caused by F. nucleatum could also arise from invasive infection into the uterine tissue originating from the colonized vagina.

== Colon cancer ==
F. nucleatum has a demonstrated association with colorectal cancer, notably studied by Susan Bullman. Fusobacterium species have been found at higher quantities in certain types of colon tumors than in surrounding colon tissue or the colons of healthy individuals, but whether this is an indirect correlation or a causal link is unclear. A distinguishing mechanism has been described by which F. nucleatum creates a pro-inflammatory environment which is conducive to tumor growth through the recruitment of tumor-infiltrating immune cells, which, unlike other bacteria linked to colorectal carcinoma, does not exacerbate other pathological processes such as colitis, enteritis and inflammatory-associated intestinal carcinogenesis. This suggests direct and specific carcinogenesis. F. nucleatum can bind to host tissue E-cadherins via a FadA, an outer membrane protein. Additionally, a surface expressed lectin called Fap2 mediates F. nucleatum adherence to colorectal cancer cells that express Gal/GalNAc moieties on their surface. Binding via Fap2 has also been shown to up-regulate production of cytokines associated with higher rates of metastasis.

== Natural competence ==
Type IV pili facilitate natural competence in F. nucleatum. Natural competence involves three principal stages: (1) Uptake of exogenous DNA and transport to the cytoplasm, (2) homologous DNA that has been taken up can integrate into the recipient cell genome by homologous recombination, and (3) the integrated exogenous DNA can express gene functions.

== See also ==
- List of bacterial vaginosis microbiota
