= Propionigenium =

Scientific classification
- Domain: Bacteria
- Kingdom: Fusobacteriati
- Phylum: Fusobacteriota
- Class: Fusobacteriia
- Order: Fusobacteriales
- Family: Fusobacteriaceae
- Genus: Propionigenium; Schink & Pfennig 1983

Type species
- Propionigenium modestum Schink & Pfennig 1983

Species
- P. maris; P. modestum

Genus of bacteria

Propionigenium is a genus of bacteria in the family Tissierellales.

== See also ==
- List of bacteria genera
- List of bacterial orders
