= Cetobacterium =

Scientific classification
- Domain: Bacteria
- Kingdom: Fusobacteriati
- Phylum: Fusobacteriota
- Class: Fusobacteriia
- Order: Fusobacteriales
- Family: Fusobacteriaceae
- Genus: Cetobacterium; Foster et al. 1996

Type species
- Cetobacterium ceti Foster et al. 1996

Species
- C. ceti; "Ca. C. colombiensis"; C. somerae

Genus of bacteria

Cetobacterium is a Gram-negative, pleomorphic, non-spore-forming, rod-shaped and non-motile genus of bacteria from the family Fusobacteriaceae.

== Phylogeny ==
The currently accepted taxonomy is based on the List of Prokaryotic names with Standing in Nomenclature (LPSN) and National Center for Biotechnology Information (NCBI).

16S rRNA based LTP_10_2024

- Cetobacterium
  - C. ceti
  - C. somerae

120 marker proteins based GTDB 10-RS226

- Cetobacterium
  - C. ceti Foster et al. 1996
  - - "Ca. C. colombiensis" Colorado Gómez et al. 2023
    - C. somerae Finegold et al. 2003
