= Peptone water =

Microbial growth medium

Peptone water is a microbial growth medium composed of peptic digest of animal or plant tissue and sodium chloride. The pH of the medium is 7.2±0.2 at 25 °C and is rich in tryptophan. Peptone water is also a non-selective broth medium which can be used as a primary enrichment medium for the growth of bacteria.
