= Sneathia =

Scientific classification
- Domain: Bacteria
- Kingdom: Fusobacteriati
- Phylum: Fusobacteriota
- Class: Fusobacteriia
- Order: Fusobacteriales
- Family: Leptotrichiaceae
- Genus: Sneathia; Collins et al. 2002

Type species
- Sneathia sanguinegens Collins et al. 2002

Species
- S. amnii; S. sanguinegens; S. vaginalis

Genus of bacteria

Sneathia is a Gram-negative, rod-shaped, non-spore-forming and non-motile genus of bacteria from the family of Leptotrichiaceae. Species have been identified as pathogens associated with bacterial vaginosis.

Sneathia is named after the microbiologist Peter H. A. Sneath.

== Phylogeny ==
The currently accepted taxonomy is based on the List of Prokaryotic names with Standing in Nomenclature (LPSN) and National Center for Biotechnology Information (NCBI)

16S rRNA based LTP_10_2024

- Sneathia
  - S. sanguinegens Collins et al. 2002
  - S. vaginalis Eisenberg et al. 2021

120 marker proteins based GTDB 09-RS220

- Sneathia
  - S. sanguinegens
  - S. vaginalis

== See also ==
- List of bacteria genera
- List of bacterial orders
