= Campylobacter ureolyticus =

Scientific classification
- Domain: Bacteria
- Kingdom: Pseudomonadati
- Phylum: Campylobacterota
- Class: "Campylobacteria"
- Order: Campylobacterales
- Family: Campylobacteraceae
- Genus: Campylobacter
- Species: C. ureolyticus

Binomial name
- Campylobacter ureolyticus (Jackson and Goodman 1978) Vandamme et al. 2010

Synonyms
- Bacteroides ureolyticus Jackson and Goodman 1978 (Approved Lists 1980)

Species of bacterium

Campylobacter ureolyticus (syn. Bacteroides ureolyticus) is a species in the bacterial genus Campylobacter of Gram-negative, obligately anaerobic bacteria. Bacteroides species are non-endospore-forming bacilli, and may be either motile or non-motile, depending on the species.

Bacteroides are normally mutualistic, a substantial portion of the mammalian gastrointestinal flora, and they process complex molecules into simpler ones. As many as 10^{10}-10^{11} cells per gram of human feces have been reported. They can use simple sugars when available; however, the main sources of energy for Bacteroides species in the gut are complex host-derived and plant glycans.

== Pathophysiology ==
Campylobacter ureolyticus has been isolated from pregnant women with symptoms of bacterial vaginosis.
