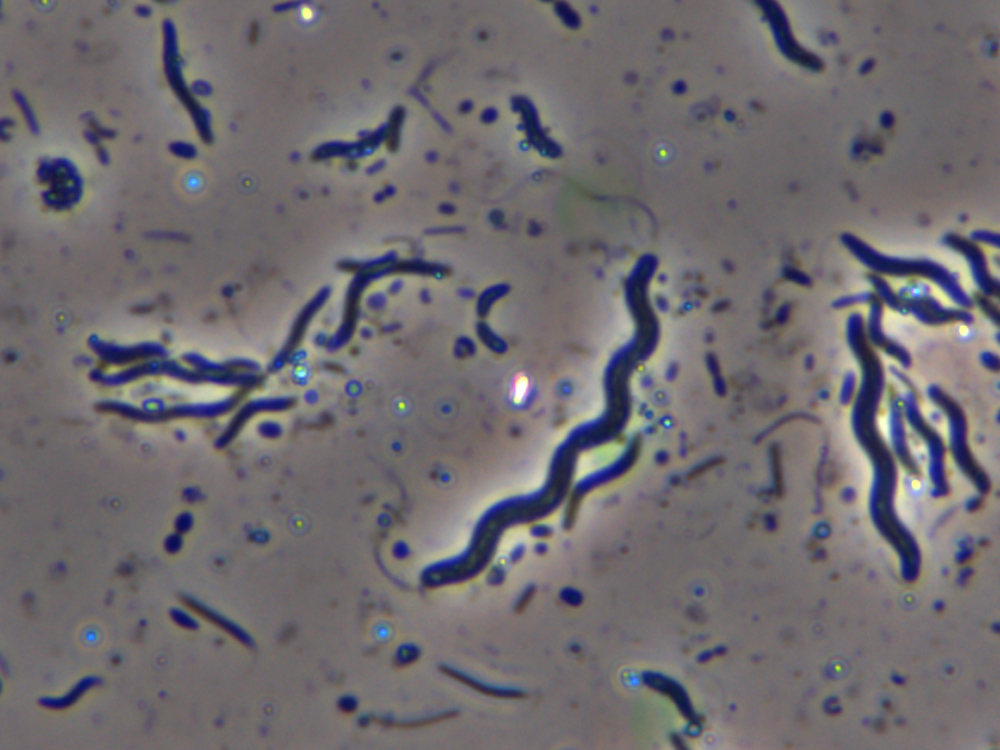
- Spirillum sp.

Scientific classification
- Domain: Bacteria
- Kingdom: Pseudomonadati
- Phylum: Pseudomonadota
- Class: Betaproteobacteria
- Order: Nitrosomonadales
- Family: Spirillaceae
- Genus: Spirillum
- Species: S. minus

Binomial name
- Spirillum minus Carter, 1887

= Spirillum minus =

Species of bacterium

Spirillum minus is an organism associated with rat-bite fever (specifically sodoku) that has never been fully identified and was assigned to the genus Spirillum in 1887 based on morphology, although it is not a validly published name. As Spirillum species are generally obligately microaerophiles and not found in mammals, this organism may be misclassified. Sequencing data should help to resolve this question.

This organism is presumed to be a bacterium. It stains gram-negative and has a coiled rod shape. It does not grow in vitro, and requires inoculation in animals for growth. No attempts to sequence the organism are known as of 2015.
