= Sodoku =

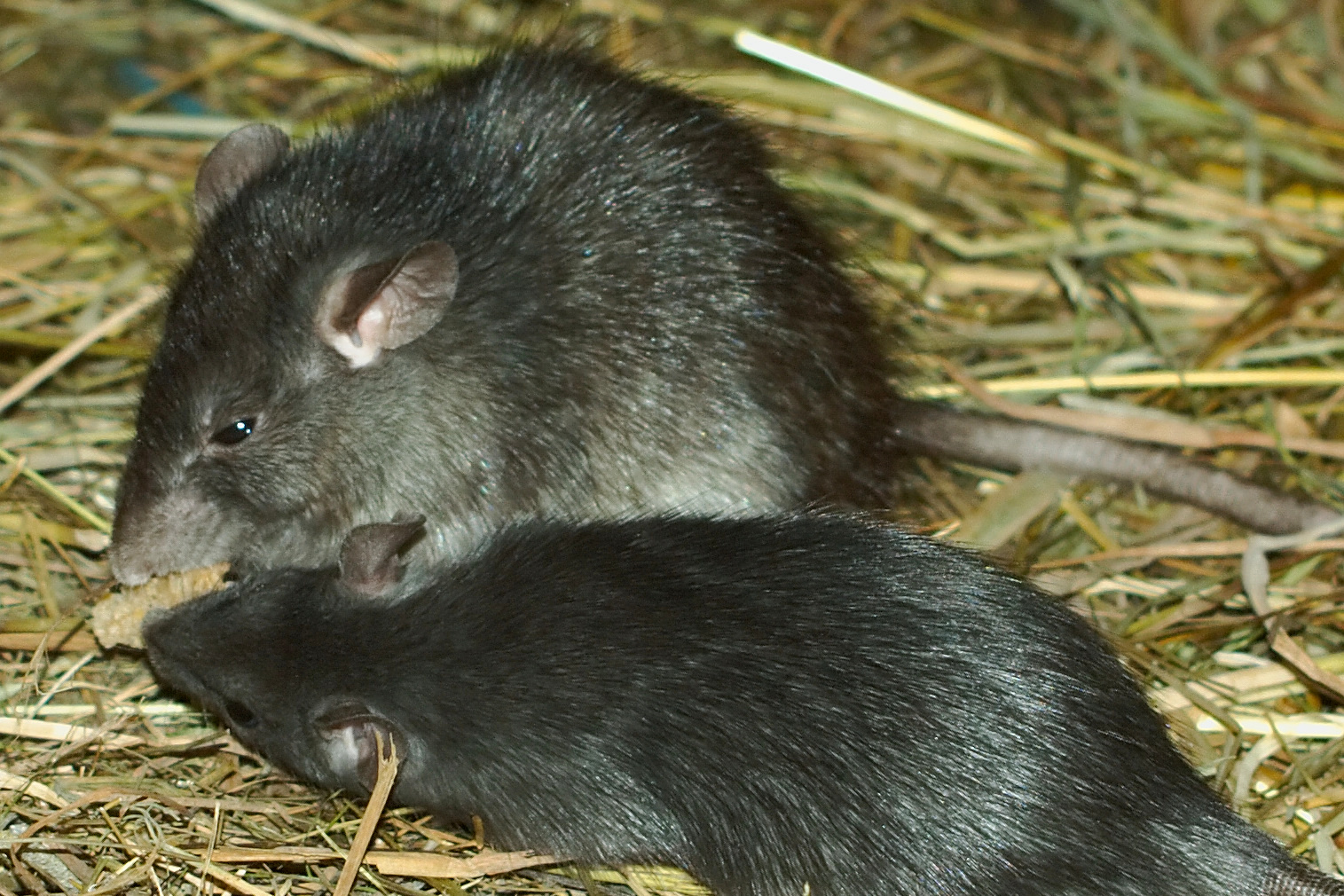
- The infections are acquired through rat bites or scratches
- Specialty: Infectious disease

Sodoku (鼠毒) is a bacterial zoonotic disease. It is caused by the Gram-negative rod Spirillum minus (also known as Spirillum minor). It is a form of rat-bite fever (RBF).

== Signs and symptoms ==
The initial scratch or wound caused by a bite from a carrier rodent results in mild inflammatory reactions and ulcerations. The wounds may heal initially, but reappear with the onset of symptoms. The symptoms include recurring fever, with body temperature 101–104 °F (38–40 °C). The fever lasts for 2–4 days, but recurs generally at 4–8 weeks. This cycle may continue for months or years. The other symptoms include regional lymphadenitis, malaise, and headache. The complications include myocarditis, endocarditis, hepatitis, splenomegaly, and meningitis.

== Causes ==
The infections are acquired through rat bites or scratches. It can occur as nosocomial infections (i.e., acquired from hospitals), or due to exposure or close associations with animals preying on rats, mice, squirrels, etc. Sodoku is mostly seen in Asia and Africa. Local transmission has been reported in US. The incubation period is 4 to 28 days.

== Prognosis ==
Mortality is 6–10%.
