= Leptotrichiaceae =

Scientific classification
- Domain: Bacteria
- Kingdom: Fusobacteriati
- Phylum: Fusobacteriota
- Class: Fusobacteriia
- Order: Fusobacteriales
- Family: Leptotrichiaceae; Gupta et al. 2013

Genera
- Caviibacter; Leptotrichia; Oceanivirga; Pseudoleptotrichia; Pseudostreptobacillus; Sebaldella; Sneathia; Streptobacillus

Synonyms
- "Leptotrichieae" Trevisan 1889; "Leptotrichioideae" Baldacci 1939; "Syncrotidae" Enderlein 1917

Family of gram-negative, anaerobic bacteria

Leptotrichiaceae is a family of bacteria in the order Fusobacteriales. The family includes several genera, such as Leptotrichia, Streptobacillus, Sneathia, Caviibacter, Oceanivirga, Sebaldella, Pseudoleptotrichia, and Pseudostreptobacillus. Bacteria in this family are gram-negative, typically anaerobic, and inhabit diverse environments, including the mucous membranes of humans and animals, as well as ocean sediments. While some species are part of the normal microbial flora, others can act as opportunistic pathogens, causing infections in immunocompromised individuals.

== Characteristics ==
Members of Leptotrichiaceae are gram-negative, rod-shaped bacteria that are non-motile and non-spore-forming. They are predominantly anaerobic or facultatively anaerobic, thriving in low-oxygen environments, and exhibit fermentative metabolism, producing organic acids from carbohydrates. Many species are fastidious, requiring enriched media such as blood or serum for growth. These bacteria are commonly isolated from the oral cavity, gastrointestinal tract, and urogenital system of mammals, as well as from marine habitats.

== Genera ==
The family Leptotrichiaceae encompasses the following genera:

- Caviibacter – Isolated from clinical specimens, including abscesses in animals.
- Leptotrichia – Found in the oral cavity and other mucous membranes; some species are implicated in infections in neutropenic patients.
- Oceanivirga – Found in marine environments, including ocean sediments and fish.
- Pseudoleptotrichia – A recently identified genus contributing to the phylogenetic diversity of Leptotrichiaceae.
- Pseudostreptobacillus – Another newly recognized genus within the family, distinct from Streptobacillus.
- Sebaldella – A genus found in the human oral and gastrointestinal microbiota, occasionally acting as an opportunistic pathogen in immunocompromised individuals.
- Sneathia – Associated with the female urogenital tract and linked to conditions like bacterial vaginosis.
- Streptobacillus – Includes Streptobacillus moniliformis, the causative agent of streptobacillary rat-bite fever, a zoonotic disease.

== Phylogeny ==
The currently accepted taxonomy is based on the List of Prokaryotic names with Standing in Nomenclature (LSPN) and National Center for Biotechnology Information (NCBI).

16S rRNA based LTP_10_2024

- Leptotrichiaceae
  - - Sebaldella Collins and Shah 1986
    - - Pseudoleptotrichia Eisenberg et al. 2020
      - Leptotrichia Trevisan 1879
  - - - Caviibacter Eisenberg et al. 2016
      - - Oceanivirga Eisenberg et al. 2016
        - Sneathia Collins et al. 2002
    - - Pseudostreptobacillus Eisenberg et al. 2020
      - Streptobacillus Levaditi, Nicolau & Poincloux 1925

120 marker proteins based GTDB 10-RS226

- Leptotrichiaceae
  - Sebaldella
  - - - - Caviibacter
        - - Oceanivirga
          - Sneathia
      - - Pseudostreptobacillus
        - Streptobacillus
    - - Pseudoleptotrichia
      - Leptotrichia

== See also ==
- Fusobacteria
- List of Bacteria genera
- List of bacterial orders
- Oral microbiology
- Zoonotic diseases
