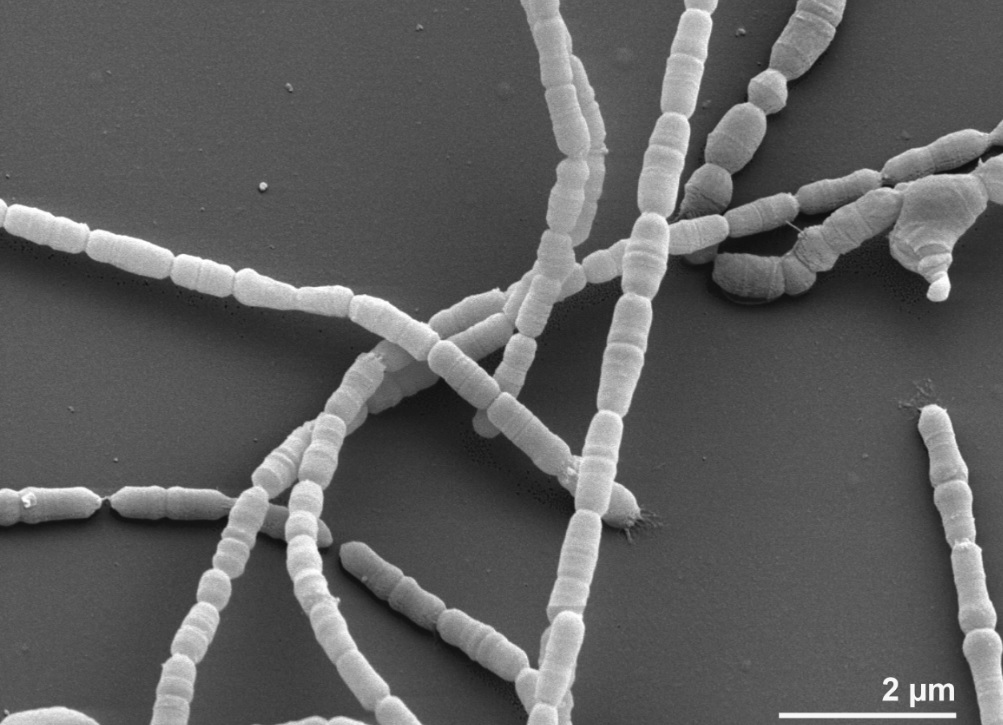
- Coriobacteriaceae

Scientific classification
- Domain: Bacteria
- Kingdom: Bacillati
- Phylum: Actinomycetota
- Class: Coriobacteriia
- Order: Coriobacteriales
- Family: Coriobacteriaceae; Stackebrandt et al. 1997

Genera
- "Ca. Allolimicola"; Collinsella; "Ca. Coprousia"; Coriobacterium; Enorma

= Coriobacteriaceae =

Family of bacteria

The Coriobacteriaceae is a family of Actinomycetota. The family Coriobacteriaceae has been shown to increase significantly in the ceca of mice in response to stress.

== Phylogeny ==
The currently accepted taxonomy is based on the List of Prokaryotic names with Standing in Nomenclature (LPSN) and National Center for Biotechnology Information (NCBI).

Nouioui et al. 2018

- Coriobacteriaceae
  - Coriobacterium
  - - Enorma
    - Collinsella

16S rRNA based LTP_10_2024

- Coriobacteriaceae
  - Enorma
  - - Coriobacterium
    - Collinsella

120 marker proteins based GTDB 10-RS226

- Coriobacteriaceae
  - - Coriobacterium Haas and König 1988
    - - - "Ca. Allolimicola" corrig. Gilroy et al. 2021
        - "Ca. Coprousia" Gilroy et al. 2021
      - Enorma Mishra et al. 2016
  - Collinsella Kageyama et al. 1999
