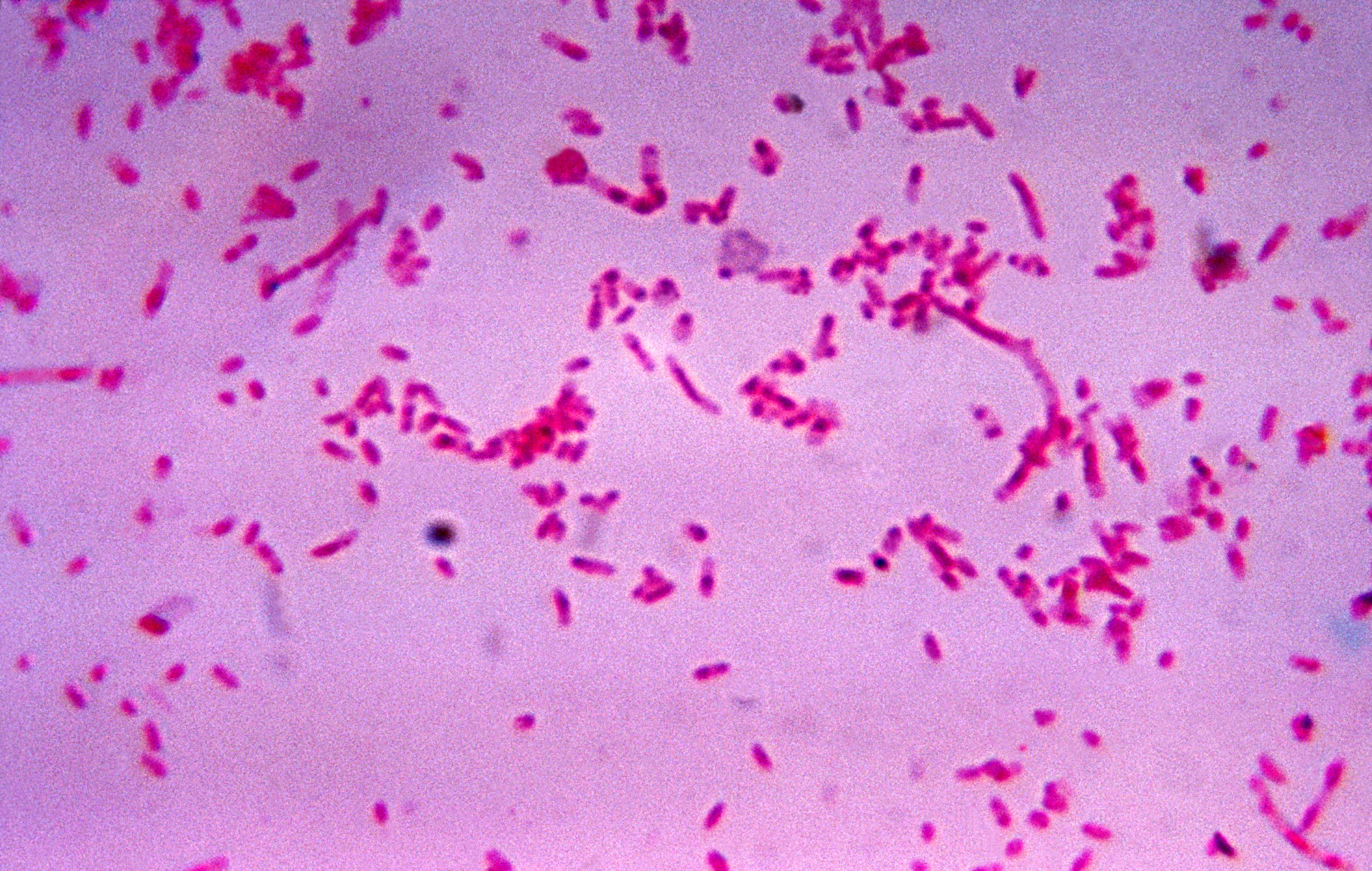
- Fusobacterium novum after being cultured in a thioglycollate medium

Scientific classification
- Domain: Bacteria
- Kingdom: Fusobacteriati
- Phylum: Fusobacteriota
- Class: Fusobacteriia
- Order: Fusobacteriales
- Family: Fusobacteriaceae; Staley and Whitman 2012

Type genus
- Fusobacterium Knorr 1922

Genera
- Cetobacterium; Fusobacterium; Hypnocyclicus; Ilyobacter; Propionigenium; Psychrilyobacter

= Fusobacteriaceae =

Family of bacteria

The Fusobacteriaceae are a family of the bacterial order Fusobacteriales.

== Phylogeny ==
The currently accepted taxonomy is based on the List of Prokaryotic names with Standing in Nomenclature (LPSN) and National Center for Biotechnology Information (NCBI).

16S rRNA based LTP_10_2024

- - Hypnocyclicus Roalkvam et al. 2015
  - - - Psychrilyobacter Zhao et al. 2009
      - - Propionigenium maris
        - Ilyobacter Stieb and Schink 1985
          (incl. Propionigenium Schink & Pfennig 1983)
    - - Cetobacterium Foster et al. 1996
      - Fusobacterium Knorr 1922

120 marker proteins based GTDB 09-RS220

- - Hypnocyclicus
  - - Psychrilyobacter
    - - - Propionigenium maris
        - Ilyobacter
      - - Fusobacterium perfoetens
        - - Cetobacterium
          - Fusobacterium

== See also ==
- List of bacteria genera
- List of bacterial orders
