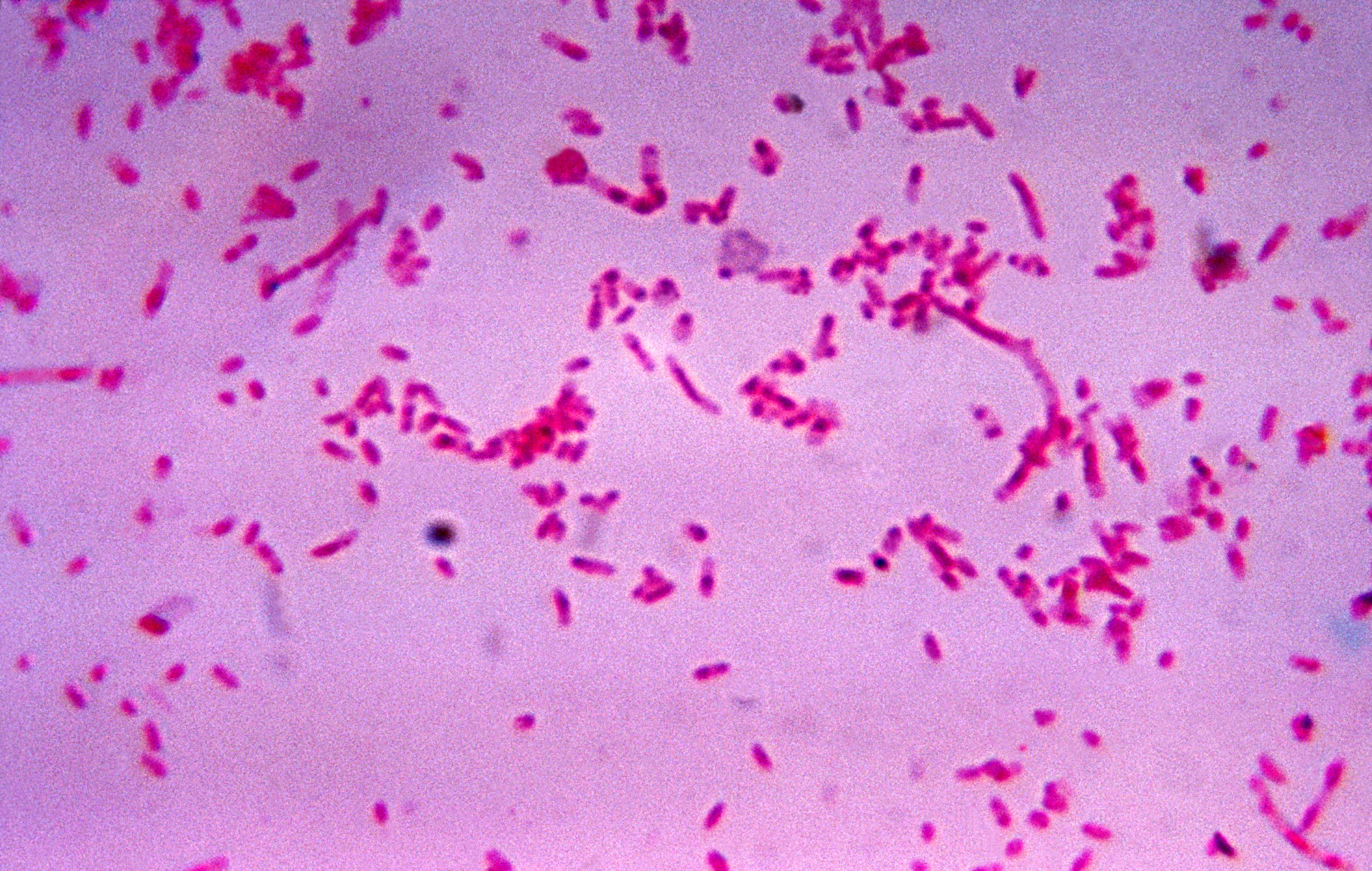
- Fusobacterium novum in liquid culture

Scientific classification
- Domain: Bacteria
- Kingdom: Fusobacteriati; Battistuzzi & Hedges 2024
- Phylum: Fusobacteriota; Garrity & Holt 2021
- Class: Fusobacteriia; Staley & Whitman 2012
- Order: Fusobacteriales; Staley & Whitman 2012

Families
- Fusobacteriaceae; Haliovirgaceae; Leptotrichiaceae

Synonyms
- Fusobacteriota: "Fusobacteria" Garrity & Holt 2001; "Fusobacteraeota" Oren et al. 2015; "Fusobacteriota" Whitman et al. 2018; Fusobacteriia: "Fusobacteria" Cavalier-Smith 2006

= Fusobacteriota =

Phylum of Gram-negative bacteria

Fusobacteriota are obligately anaerobic non-sporeforming Gram-negative bacilli. Since the first reports in the late nineteenth century, various names have been applied to these organisms, sometimes with the same name being applied to different species. More recently, not only have there been changes to the nomenclature, but also attempts to differentiate between species which are believed to be either pathogenic or commensal or both. Because of their asaccharolytic nature, and a general paucity of positive results in routine biochemical tests, laboratory identification of the Fusobacteriota has been difficult. However, the application of novel molecular biological techniques to taxonomy has established a number of new species, together with the subspeciation of Fusobacterium necrophorum and F. nucleatum, and provided new methods for identification. The involvement of Fusobacteriota in a wide spectrum of human infections causing tissue necrosis and septicaemia has long been recognised, and, more recently, their importance in intra-amniotic infections, premature labour and tropical ulcers has been reported.

Since the first reports of Fusobacteriota in the late nineteenth century, the variety of species names has led to some confusion within the genera Fusobacterium and Leptotrichia. However, newer methods of investigation have led to a better understanding of the taxonomy, with the description of several new species of Fusobacteriota. Among the new species described are F. ulcerans from tropical ulcers, and several species from the oral cavity. Subspeciation of the important species F. necrophorum and F. nucleatum has also been possible. It is probable that the taxonomy of the Fusobacteriota may be further developed in the future.

It is the sole phylum in the kingdom Fusobacteriati.

== Phylogeny ==
The currently accepted taxonomy is based on the List of Prokaryotic names with Standing in Nomenclature (LSPN) and National Center for Biotechnology Information (NCBI).

16S rRNA based LTP_10_2024

- - - Haliovirgaceae
      Haliovirga Miyazaki et al. 2023
  - - Leptotrichiaceae
      - - Sebaldella Collins and Shah 1986
        - - Pseudoleptotrichia Eisenberg et al. 2020
          - Leptotrichia Trevisan 1879
      - - - Caviibacter Eisenberg et al. 2016
          - - Oceanivirga Eisenberg et al. 2016
            - Sneathia Collins et al. 2002
        - - Pseudostreptobacillus Eisenberg et al. 2020
          - Streptobacillus Levaditi, Nicolau & Poincloux 1925
    - Fusobacteriaceae
      - Hypnocyclicus Roalkvam et al. 2015
      - - - Psychrilyobacter Zhao et al. 2009
          - - Propionigenium maris
            - Ilyobacter Stieb and Schink 1985
              (incl. Propionigenium Schink & Pfennig 1983)
        - - Cetobacterium Foster et al. 1996
          - Fusobacterium Knorr 1922

120 marker proteins based GTDB 10-RS226

- - - Haliovirgaceae
      Haliovirga
  - - Leptotrichiaceae
      - Sebaldella
      - - - - Caviibacter
            - - Oceanivirga
              - Sneathia
          - - Pseudostreptobacillus
            - Streptobacillus
        - - Pseudoleptotrichia
          - Leptotrichia
    - Fusobacteriaceae
      - Hypnocyclicus
      - - Psychrilyobacter
        - - - Propionigenium
            - Ilyobacter
          - - Fusobacterium perfoetens
            - - Cetobacterium
              - Fusobacterium

== Role in human disease ==
New evidence is emerging that this bacterium may cause or be related to human colon cancer. In 2011 investigators reported the presence of Fusobacteriota in colon cancer tissue (Genome Res 2012; 22:292) and a new multicenter study provides evidence that some cases-particularly right-sided might be caused by infection by Fusobacteriota.
