= Warwick L. Nicholas =

English-born Australian parasitologist

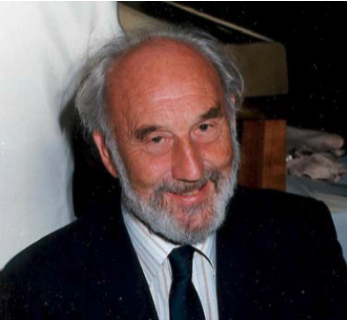
- Born: April 3, 1926; Cheshire, England
- Died: May 5, 2010 (aged 84); Canberra, Australia
- Other name: Nick
- Education: University of Liverpool (PhD); Australian National University (ANU)
- Partner: Evelyn Nicholas
- Children: 4
- Scientific career
- Fields: Zoology; Nematology; Parasitology
- Thesis: The Role of Culicoides in the Epidemiology of Acanthocheilonema Perstans in the British Cameroons (1953)

Warwick Llewellyn Nicholas (1926–2010) was an Australian zoologist known as a pioneer in the field of nematology. He was a foundational member of the Australian Society for Parasitology (ASP) and in 1964, he organised the first ASP meeting. He became President of the Society in 1978, before being an elected Fellow from 1979.

== Early life and education ==
Warwick Nicholas was affectionately known by family, friends and colleagues as "Nick" or "Dr Nick" for most of his life (in later years expressing a preference to revert to Warwick). He was born in 1926 in Cheshire, a historic county in the north west of England. He lived his early childhood under the care of his mother and several relatives, and his father died when Nick was quite young of age. At one stage Nick and his mother moved from living in England to Canada.

As a child, he attended a number of different schools; from all reports few being very happy experiences. However, it was at one of these schools Nick developed his lifelong interest in aquatic invertebrates - Dauntsey's School. Dauntsey's was a public school in Wiltshire that specialised in the fields of science and agriculture. Here he became interested in exploring the life within the dew-ponds on the Salisbury Plain, ran the school aquarium, and developed his love for microscopy.

== Career ==
=== Service in WWII ===
After finishing school during the Second World War, he served in the military training to become a pilot. His aviation training began in UK and concluded in the USA. Throughout this time, Nick developed a substantial amount of flying experience, with much of it being solo flight. However, the war ended before his pilot training led to active service. After the war, Nick returned to the UK and continued his military training as a radar medic. After demobilisation, he concluded his service in 1946 in the role of officer.

=== Career and research - in the UK and USA (1947 - 1960) ===
After the war, Nick took up an opportunity to attend university. He studied Zoology and other sciences at the University of Liverpool, where he graduated with First Class Honours in 1951. He was then awarded a Research Assistantship at the Liverpool School of Tropical Medicine, where he enrolled for a PhD. His PhD work led him to studying insect-vectored diseases in West Africa. He was awarded the doctorate in 1953 for the specific work he did there on filariasis and the role of the biting midge Culicoides. Following this work in 1953, Nick won a Beit postdoctoral fellowship at the University of Liverpool and was appointed to a Lectureship in the Department of Zoology from 1955 - 1960. This enabled Nick to continue his work on rhabditid nematodes. Here too he was able to begin working on a group of parasitic worms - the Acanthocephala - a largely neglected group of nematodes at the time. Through various outside influences at this time, Nick began a long career of researching virtually unaided into nematodes. At this time he had found his true calling in life, and his life-long partner, his wife Evelyn.

==== Contributions to Advances in Molecular Biology - C. elegans as a Model System ====
During his postdoctoral at the University of Liverpool (1955-1960), Nick produced some of the most historically significant findings from his research; which began with his development of the first axenic cultures of both the Bristol and Bergerac strains of Caenorhabditis elegans in 1956. In 1957 & 1958, Nick was a Travelling Fellow of the British Medical Research Council (MRC), funded by a Rockefeller grant (on leave from the University of Liverpool). During the tenure of his fellowship, he worked with Ellsworth C. Dougherty and Eder L. Hansen in the Lab of Comparative Biology at the Kaiser Foundation Research Institute in Richmond CA. Among other areas of research, an objective was to determine the nature of undefined factors of Rb and Cb required for axenic culture of Caenorhabditis briggsae. Rb and Cb factors were provided by bovine liver extract (among other sources). Rb and Cb became the initial letters of R. and later C. briggsae. In their last publications on the subject, the authors described for the first time a fully defined medium (GS-25), which could sustain the development of C. elegans from larvae into adult, with just once the production of an F1 generation. It was found this medium with 1% of a protein fraction of bovine liver (LPF-C) could allow them to produce up to eight successive generations of C. elegans.

===== Importance of the Nicholas, Dougherty, & Brenner connection at MRC =====
At MRC, Sydney Brenner was known as the "mover and shaker". He long debated what the next steps in the translation of Watson & Crick's greater understanding "life" would be. Nicholas provided cultures of Bristol and Bergerac strains of C. elegans to Dougherty, and provided some ideas to Brenner through Dougherty. When Brenner visited the Department of Nematology at UC Davis in 1987, he talked about how his ideas changed from initially planning to use C. briggsae, to using Nicholas' C. elegans Bristol strain after discussing with Dougherty the plans for his experiments - what became Brenner's Nobel Prize-winning work.

Brenner's initial thoughts on the use of C. briggsae are recorded notably in his letter to Max Perutz and proposal to the MRC, both in 1963:

Part of the success of molecular genetics was due to the use of extremely simple organisms which could be handled in large numbers...We should like to attack the problem of cellular development in a similar fashion, choosing the simplest possible differentiated organism and subjecting it to the analytical methods of microbial genetics...We think we have a good candidate in the form of a small nematode worm, Caenorhabditis briggsiae...To start with we propose to identify every cell in the worm and trace lineages. We shall also investigate the constancy of development and study its genetic control by looking for mutants.

— Proposal to the Medical Research Council (UK), October 1963

Nicholas and Dougherty made several important findings while developing culturing techniques for strains of C. briggsae and C. elegans, which highly influenced Brenner's species and strain selection for genetic work. These included:

- Ratio of female:male offspring
- Critical temperatures the strains could be cultured at, while identifying temperature males will not copulate at. For example, the Bristol strain of C. elegans could be cultured up to 25 °C, yet the males would not copulate below 20 °C (leaving a 5 °C window). It was also found the Bergerac strain of C. elegans could not be cultured above 18 °C.
- Temperature embryogenesis fails at. For example, Rhabditis cucumeris embryogenesis fails at 25 °C.

It was such evidence provided by Nicholas and Dougherty, with Dougherty's conversations with Brenner, that led to C. elegans being selected as the first multicellular organism to have its genome sequenced in 1998. When it came time for this work to begin, Nicholas took L. N. Staniland's extraction of the Bristol strain of C. elegans (found in mushroom compost in England), produced the axenic culture of it, and brought it to Dougherty's lab. It was a remarkable journey in itself transporting the cultures across the world from the UK to America; Nick and his wife Evelyn brought with them on ship the vials of the culture, along with the 'recipe' for keeping the cultures alive in his notebook (in times of less-stringent boarder biosecurity). Brenner then received cultures of this strain from Dougherty.

===== Ongoing importance of C. elegans =====
Over the decades since Nick's first axenic cultures of C. elegans, and Brenner's first demonstrations of it as a model organism for molecular and developmental biology, C. elegans has become one of the main model organisms in the field. Its significance is regarded on par with the species Drosophila melanogaster (vinegar fly) and Saccharomyces cerevisiae (baker's yeast).

Virtually all genetics conducted with C. elegans has been conducted using the Bristol strain, and more specifically the N2 line Brenner obtained and derived from Nicholas and Dougherty's culture.

Nobel prizes have been awarded in 2002 and 2006 for studies using N2 line, Bristol strain C. elegans as a model systemref name=":7" />

=== Career and research - in Australia (1960-onwards) ===
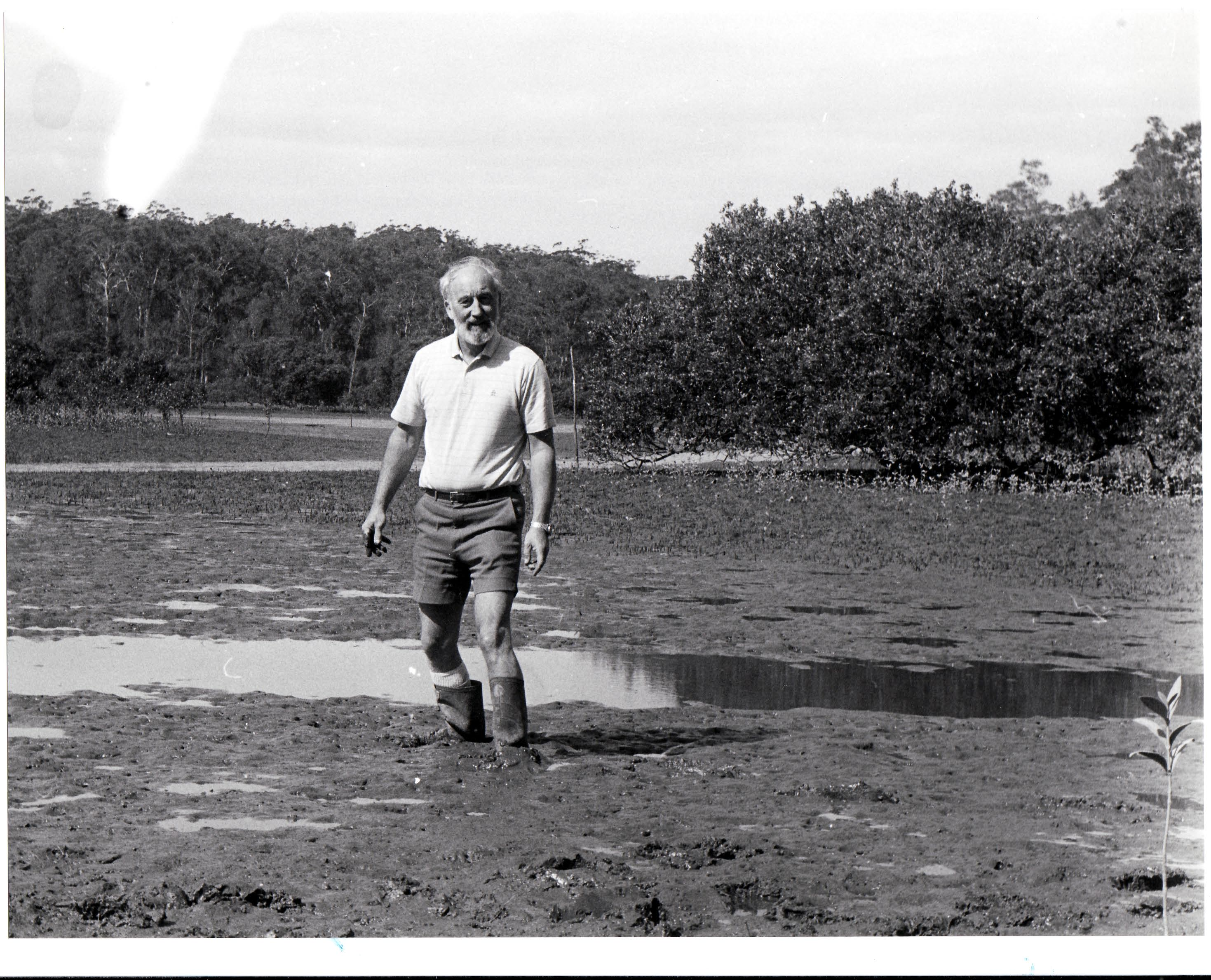
Warwick Nicholas gathering nematodes in NSW south coast mud.

Nicholas was an author of The Biology of Free-Living Nematodes (1975), published by Clarendon Press, Oxford. This remains a classic and important resource for those working on the ecology of nematodes. He described 35 new species and 5 new genera of nematodes. He was a founder of the Australian Society for Parasitology, and an editor of the Australasian Nematologists Newsletter.

Provided knowledge and skills, with collegial conduit Ellsworth C. Dougherty, on species C. elegans vitally important to Sydney Brenner's work. Brenner shared in a Nobel Prize in 2002 "for their discoveries concerning genetic regulation of organ development and programmed cell death".

== See also ==
- History of model organisms
- Whole genome sequencing - For further on the role of C. elegans in the history of genome sequencing.
- Nicholas' sister Isabel Nicholas (also known with surname Rawsthorne, Delmer and Lambert) - British painter and model
