= Caenorhabditis drosophilae =

Scientific classification
- Domain: Eukaryota
- Kingdom: Animalia
- Phylum: Nematoda
- Class: Chromadorea
- Order: Rhabditida
- Family: Rhabditidae
- Genus: Caenorhabditis
- Species: C. drosophilae

Binomial name
- Caenorhabditis drosophilae (Kiontke, 1997)

Synonyms
- Rhabditis (Caenorhabditis) drosophilae Kiontke, 1997; Rhabditis drosophilae

Species of roundworm

Caenorhabditis drosophilae is a species of nematodes. It was recovered, along with Rhabditis sonorae, from saguaro cactus rot in Arizona. The species was found on the fly Drosophila nigrospiracula.

C. drosophilae forms a Drosophilae supergroup with other Caenorhabditis species (C. virilis, C. castelli, C. angaria). This supergroup gathers species associated with rotten cactus or fruit and Drosophila species. It opposes the elegans supergroup where C. elegans stands.
