= Caenorhabditis macrosperma =

Scientific classification
- Domain: Eukaryota
- Kingdom: Animalia
- Phylum: Nematoda
- Class: Chromadorea
- Order: Rhabditida
- Family: Rhabditidae
- Genus: Caenorhabditis
- Species: C. macrosperma

Binomial name
- Caenorhabditis macrosperma Félix, Marie-Anne; Braendle, Christian; Cutter, Asher D., 2014

Synonyms
- Caenorhabditis sp. 18

Species of roundworm

Caenorhabditis macrosperma is a species of nematodes in the genus Caenorhabditis. Prior to 2014, it was referred to as C. sp. 18. The type isolate was collected in Nouragues, French Guiana.

This species groups with the C. nouraguensis/C. yunquensis branch in the 'Japonica' group, the sister clade to the 'Elegans' group, in the 'Elegans' supergroup.
