= Caenorhabditis sp. 8 =

Scientific classification
- Kingdom: Animalia
- Phylum: Nematoda
- Class: Chromadorea
- Order: Rhabditida
- Family: Rhabditidae
- Genus: Caenorhabditis
- Species: C. sp. 8

Binomial name
- Caenorhabditis sp. 8

Species of roundworm

Caenorhabditis sp. 8 is an unnamed species of nematode, in the same genus as the model organism Caenorhabditis elegans. It was collected from rotting tomatoes in New Jersey, USA, in July 2007.

This species groups near the C. angaria/C. castelli branch in the 'Drosophilae' supergroup in phylogenetic studies.
