= Caenorhabditis briggsae =

Scientific classification
- Kingdom: Animalia
- Phylum: Nematoda
- Class: Chromadorea
- Order: Rhabditida
- Family: Rhabditidae
- Genus: Caenorhabditis
- Species: C. briggsae

Binomial name
- Caenorhabditis briggsae (Dougherty and Nigon, 1949)

Synonyms
- Rhabditis briggsae Dougherty and Nigon, 1949

Species of roundworm

Caenorhabditis briggsae is a small nematode, closely related to Caenorhabditis elegans. The differences between the two species are subtle. The male tail in C. briggsae has a slightly different morphology from C. elegans. Other differences include changes in vulval precursor competence and the placement of the excretory duct opening. C. briggsae is frequently used to study the differences between it and the more intimately understood C. elegans, especially at the DNA and protein sequence level. Several mutant strains of C. briggsae have also been isolated that facilitate genetic analysis of this organism. C. briggsae, like C. elegans, is a hermaphrodite. The first draft genome sequence for C. briggsae was published in 2003.

== History ==
C. briggsae was initially discovered by Margaret Briggs in 1944. The first individuals were isolated from a pile of leaves found on the Palo Alto campus of Stanford University. Briggs, who was studying for her MS, identified the nematodes as an unknown species of the genus Rhabditis. They were formally described in 1949 by Dougherty and Nigon and named Rhabditis briggsae. Both C. briggsae and C. elegans (then known as Rhabditis elegans) were placed into a new subgenus Caenorhabditis in 1952. The subgenus was later elevated to a genus in 1955. Briggs' initial work with the organism looked at its lifecycle in various kinds of media in the presence and absence of bacteria. She later used the organism in studies on the effects of antibiotics. This work was important in the development of axenic culture methods.

== Habitat ==
C. briggsae can often be found in compost, garden beds, moist mushrooms, or rotting fruit rich with microorganisms and various nutrients. The organism's main habitat is often considered to be the temperate regions of the globe, often accompanying its relatives C. elegans and C. remanei.

== Genomics ==
A telomere-to-telomere gap-free genome assembly of Caenorhabditis briggsae was published in 2026 for the canonical AF16 reference strain background. The genome assembly is approximately 106.8 Mb in size and resolves all six chromosomes with no gaps or unassigned scaffolds. The assembly has a BUSCO completeness score of 99.7% and provides updated annotations of protein-coding genes to support comparative genomics studies with Caenorhabditis elegans.

=== Overview of genome ===
The genome of C. briggsae is approximately 100–107 Mb in size and is predicted to encode about 20,000 genes. The original draft genome study revealed that the genomes of C. briggsae and C. elegans have much in common. For example, both worms have the same number of chromosomes (six), similar genome size, and similar numbers of protein coding and nonprotein coding genes. Further analysis demonstrated about 62% of the protein-coding genes in C. briggsae have orthologs in C. elegans. Nevertheless, many interesting species-specific features including genes exist, which serve as the foundation for comparative analysis.

=== Comparative genomics ===
This species groups with C. nigoni in the 'Elegans' supergroup in phylogenetic studies.

==== Comparison with C. elegans ====
C. briggsae is a soil nematode estimated to have diverged from C. elegans around 80–100 million years ago, and yet is morphologically almost indistinguishable from it. Areas of sequence-encoding proteins are mostly conserved between the two species, while most intergenic and intronic sequences are divergent. Areas of similarity between the sequences of the two organisms can suggest coding exons or point to regulatory regions and to RNA genes missed in standard analysis.
