= History of research on Caenorhabditis elegans =

The nematode worm Caenorhabditis elegans was first studied in the laboratory by Victor Nigon and Ellsworth Dougherty in the 1940s, but came to prominence after being adopted by Sydney Brenner in 1963 as a model organism for the study of developmental biology using genetics. In 1974, Brenner published the results of his first genetic screen, which isolated hundreds of mutants with morphological and functional phenotypes, such as being uncoordinated. In the 1980s, John Sulston and co-workers identified the lineage of all 959 cells in the adult hermaphrodite, the first genes were cloned, and the physical map began to be constructed. In 1998, the worm became the first multi-cellular organism to have its genome sequenced. Notable research using C. elegans includes the discoveries of caspases, RNA interference, and microRNAs. Eight scientists have won the Nobel Prize for their work on C. elegans.

== Early research ==
C. elegans was first described in 1900 by Émile Maupas, who isolated it from soil in Algeria. Ellsworth Dougherty proposed in 1948 that free-living nematodes of the sub-order Rhabditina might be useful for genetic study, noting their relative structural simplicity and invariant cell lineage (eutely). Dougherty and Victor Nigon obtained the first mutant, from a laboratory culture of the closely related nematode Caenorhabditis briggsae. However much of the early laboratory work on Caenorhabditis nematodes was directed towards the establishment of a defined axenic culture medium.

== Brenner's search for a new model system ==
By the early 1960s, Sydney Brenner had made several important contributions to molecular biology, notably a demonstration (with Francis Crick and other colleagues) that the genetic code is triplet in nature. In June 1963, he wrote to Max Perutz, then the head of the MRC Laboratory of Molecular Biology, Cambridge, proposing future research:

It is now widely realized that nearly all the 'classical' problems of molecular biology have either been solved or will be solved in the next decade...Because of this, I have long felt that the future of molecular biology lies in the extension of research to other fields of biology, notably development and the nervous system...I would like to tame a small metazoan organism to study development directly. My ideas on this are still fluid and I cannot specify this in greater detail at the present time.

— Letter to Max Perutz, 5 June 1963

By the end of that year, his thoughts were more concrete:

Part of the success of molecular genetics was due to the use of extremely simple organisms which could be handled in large numbers...We should like to attack the problem of cellular development in a similar fashion, choosing the simplest possible differentiated organism and subjecting it to the analytical methods of microbial genetics...We think we have a good candidate in the form of a small nematode worm, Caenorhabditis briggsiae...To start with we propose to identify every cell in the worm and trace lineages. We shall also investigate the constancy of development and study its genetic control by looking for mutants.

— Proposal to the Medical Research Council (UK), October 1963

Brenner obtained C. elegans from Dougherty and began to study them in the laboratory by December 1963.

== Transgenesis ==
C. elegans is amenable to transgenesis, the process of introducing foreign genetic material into the genome. The most frequent method for generating transgenic worms is to inject exogenous DNA into the syncytial germ line; biolistic transformation can also be used.

== Awards ==
In 2002, the Nobel Prize in Physiology or Medicine was jointly awarded to Sydney Brenner, H. Robert Horvitz, and John Sulston for their work on Caenorhabditis elegans involving research on the genetic regulation of organ development and apoptosis. The research done by these three established what would become known as the "central dogma" of apoptosis (programmed cell death). Sydney Brenner was the scientist who demonstrated both that specific gene mutations can be induced in these nematodes and that the different mutations can be linked to specific genes and the specific effects they have on organ development monitored from there in a 1974 publication. John Sulston then found that the cell lineage of the nematodes went through an identical process of cell division and differentiation. He then found that there are cells in the cell lineage that always die through apoptosis and that this could be observed using the nematodes, finding that the protein found in the nuc-1 gene is essential for the degradation of DNA in the dead cell. Robert Horvitz then was able to continue the work from these two predecessors, identifying the genes ced-3 and ced-4 that are required for apoptosis to happen with the nematodes. Horvitz was additionally able to demonstrate that the gene ced-9 protects cells from apoptosis through its interactions with the two previous genes that are required for apoptosis. Horvitz was also able to show that the human genome has a ced-3 counterpart, demonstrating the connection of this research to humans.

In 2006, the Nobel Prize in Physiology or Medicine was jointly awarded to Andrew Z. Fire and Craig C. Mello for their discovery of RNA interference and gene silencing by dsRNA. The two were originally researching gene expression regulation with the nematodes by injecting messenger RNA that encoded for a muscle protein but were noticing no change with the worms movement. They then tried injecting both the sense and antisense strands of RNA together which led them to discover that double stranded RNA was silencing the gene that normally carried the protein code. Further experimentation proved that dsRNA can silence genes and that RNA interference is specific for the gene that has the same code as the injected RNA. This can be inherited and spread between cells as well.

In 2008, the Nobel Prize for Chemistry was jointly awarded to Osamu Shimomura, Martin Chalfie, and Roger Y. Tsien for the discovery and development of the green fluorescent protein (GFP). Osamu Shimomura is credited with first isolating the fluorescent protein from a jellyfish (Aequorea victoria) and discovering that it glows a bright green color when under an ultraviolet light. Martin Chalfie is credited with discovering the value of using the GFP as a genetic marker for biological processes in research. Using Caenorhabditis elegans, Martin was able to color six individual cells of interest for an experiment. Roger Y. Tsien was able to extend the color palette of the GFP into various other colors which then allowed further research potential with various proteins at once.

== Neuroscience ==
Sydney Brenner was one of the first people to choose to study development and the nervous system for Caenorhabditis elegans. This was due to the shortened life cycle of the nematodes, the ability to manipulate genes within the nematodes, as well as the capacity to study large quantities with minimal supplies. Sulston along with White were then able to map out the entire nervous system for the nematodes. Sulston took on the task of mapping out cell lineage in C. elegans from the single cell through an adult worm using microscopy. John White was working on mapping out an ultra structure model of the nematodes nervous system. Working with Nichol Thomson and Eileen Southgate, the three were able to create an ultra structure analysis of the entire nervous system of the nematode.

== See also ==
- History of model organisms
