= Caenorhabditis doughertyi =

Scientific classification
- Kingdom: Animalia
- Phylum: Nematoda
- Class: Chromadorea
- Order: Rhabditida
- Family: Rhabditidae
- Genus: Caenorhabditis
- Species: C. doughertyi

Binomial name
- Caenorhabditis doughertyi Felix, Braendle & Cutter, 2014

Strains
- JU1333; JU1771

Synonyms
- Caenorhabditis sp. 10

Species of roundworm

Caenorhabditis doughertyi is a species of nematodes in the genus Caenorhabditis. Prior to 2014, it was referred to as C. sp. 10

JU1333 wild isolate was collected from rotting cacao fruits in Kerala, India in 2007.

The specific epithet is a tribute to Ellsworth Dougherty who was first studied the nematode worm Caenorhabditis elegans in the laboratory with Victor Nigon in the 1940s.

This species groups with C. brenneri in the 'Elegans' supergroup in phylogenetic studies.
