= Caenorhabditis wallacei =

Scientific classification
- Domain: Eukaryota
- Kingdom: Animalia
- Phylum: Nematoda
- Class: Chromadorea
- Order: Rhabditida
- Family: Rhabditidae
- Genus: Caenorhabditis
- Species: C. wallacei

Binomial name
- Caenorhabditis wallacei Felix, Braendle & Cutter, 2014

Synonyms
- Caenorhabditis sp. 16

Species of roundworm

Caenorhabditis wallacei - prior to 2014 referred to as C. sp. 16, is a species of Caenorhabditis nematode. The type isolate was collected in Central Bali, Indonesia.

C. wallacei groups in phylogenetic trees with C. tropicalis, in the 'Elegans' supergroup.
