= Caenorhabditis nigoni =

Scientific classification
- Kingdom: Animalia
- Phylum: Nematoda
- Class: Chromadorea
- Order: Rhabditida
- Family: Rhabditidae
- Genus: Caenorhabditis
- Species: C. nigoni

Binomial name
- Caenorhabditis nigoni Felix, Braendle & Cutter, 2014

Strains
- JU1325; JU1422; KK-2011; MAF-2010

Synonyms
- Caenorhabditis sp. 9

Species of roundworm

Caenorhabditis nigoni is a male-female species in the Elegans group of the genus Caenorhabditis, first identified and described as "Caenorhabditis species 9" or "C. sp. 9" before being renamed as "C. nigoni". The specific epithet is a tribute to Victor Nigon who first studied Caenorhabditis elegans in the laboratory with Ellsworth Dougherty in the 1940s (Nigon, 1949). Isolates come from the Democratic Republic of the Congo and Kerala, India.

== C. briggsae hybrids research ==
C. nigoni is noteworthy because it is very closely related to the hermaphroditic species, C. briggsae. Despite substantial differences between C. nigoni and C. briggsae in their modes of sexual reproduction (50:50% female:male versus 99:1% hermaphrodite:male, respectively), their genome sizes (129 Mb versus 108 Mb, respectively), and their protein-coding gene counts (29,167 versus 22,313, respectively), these two species can interbreed to produce not merely viable male and female hybrid offspring, but partially fertile female hybrid offspring.

Nevertheless, hybrids between these two species are subject to Haldane's law: heterogametic offspring (males) are much less viable than females. A detailed map of hybrid incompatibility sites for the C. briggsae genome was generated in 2015. Hybrid male inviability primarily manifests itself during embryonic development and is most pronounced at lower growth temperature. Moreover, surviving C. nigoni/C. briggsae hybrid males are sterile. This sterility is at least partially caused by the presence of either of two X-chromosomal subsequences from C. briggsae, either of which is associated with abnormal transcriptional downregulation of C. nigoni autosomal genes encoding spermatogenic functions; this downregulation may be due to abnormal upregulation in hybrids of a subset of 22G RNAs specifically targeting the down-regulated spermatogenic genes.

Yin et al. (2018) have produced a third-generation genome assembly of C. nigoni, which they used to define which genes differ between the two species and to begin characterizing the functional effects of these differences. They report that most of the difference in gene count between C. nigoni and C. briggsae is due to gene losses in the latter species, that these lost genes encode (in C. nigoni) disproportionately short proteins with disproportionately high levels of male-biased RNA-seq expression, that the lost genes include three Male Secreted Short (mss) genes, and that transgenic restoration of mss-1 and mss-2 from C. nigoni to C. briggsae causes C. briggsae males to become much more effective at reproductive competition (both against other males, and against hermaphroditic self-fertilization).

The differences in genome sizes are not due to bulk changes in repetitive DNA, because both genomes have closely similar fractions of repetitive elements (C. nigoni 27% versus C. briggsae 25%). However, there does exist a higher proportion of satellite DNAs in C. nigoni than in C. briggsae, along with more species-specific families of satellite DNA in C. nigoni.

In parallel work using an independently produced third-generation genome assembly of C. nigoni, Ren et al. (2018) analyzed whole-genome alignments of the chromosomes of C. nigoni to C. briggsae; they report that the two genomes have broad chromosomal synteny, but also have many intra- and inter-chromosomal sequence rearrangements. These rearrangements are likely to impede meiotic recombination between chromosomes of the two species, and might also cause partial inviability and infertility of interspecies hybrids.
