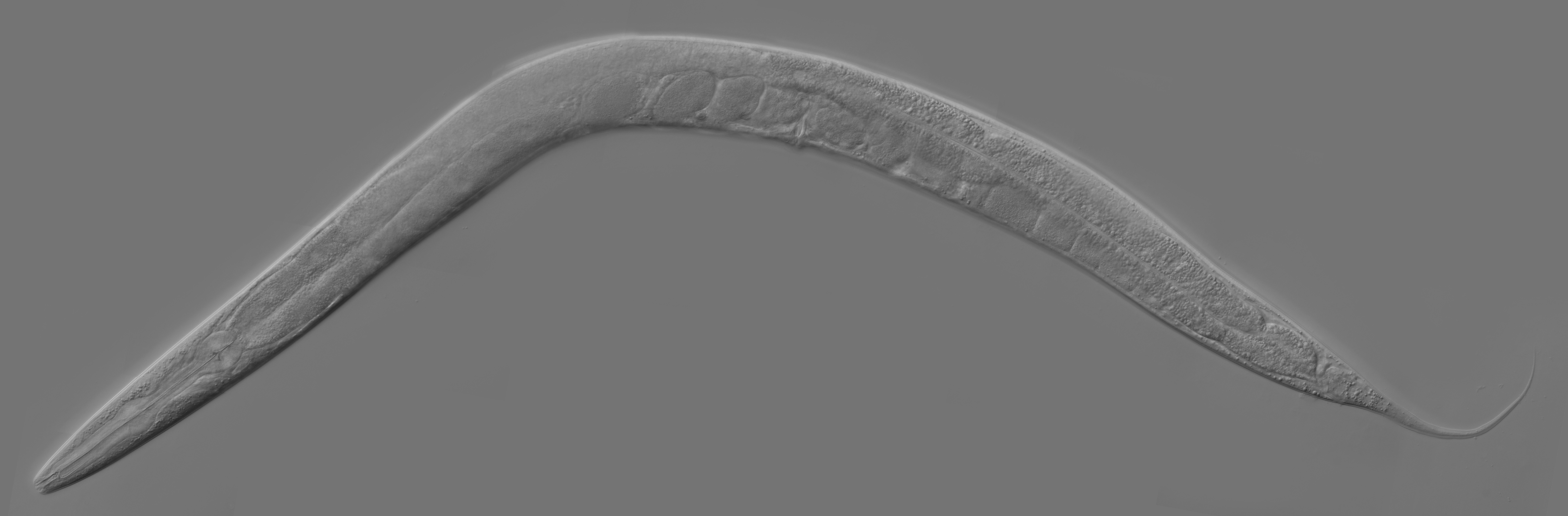
- Caenorhabditis elegans

Scientific classification
- Kingdom: Animalia
- Phylum: Nematoda
- Class: Chromadorea
- Order: Rhabditida
- Family: Rhabditidae
- Genus: Caenorhabditis; Osche, 1952

Synonyms
- Rhabditis (Caenorhabditis) Osche, 1952

= Caenorhabditis =

Genus of roundworms

Caenorhabditis is a genus of nematodes which live in bacteria-rich environments like compost piles, decaying dead animals and rotting fruit. The name comes from Greek: caeno- (καινός (caenos) = new, recent); rhabditis = rod-like (ῥάβδος (rhabdos) = rod, wand).

The genus Caenorhabditis contains the noted model organism Caenorhabditis elegans and several other species for which a genome sequence is either available or currently being determined. The two most-studied species in this genus (C. elegans and C. briggsae) are both androdioecious (they have male and hermaphrodite sexes) whereas most other species are gonochoristic (they have male and female sexes).

C. elegans is the type species of the genus. In 1900, Maupas initially named the species Rhabditis elegans, Osche placed it in the subgenus Caenorhabditis in 1952, and in 1955, Dougherty raised Caenorhabditis to the status of genus.

== Ecology ==
Caenorhabditis occupy various nutrient and bacteria rich environments. They do not form self-sustaining populations in soil, as it lacks enough organic matter. Juvenile worms and also dauer larvae can be transported by invertebrates including millipedes, insects, isopods, and gastropods. Some species also appear to be associated with vertebrates including zebu cattle, although the nature of this association is not clear. The species can be classified as 'phoretic' or 'necromenic' based on their relationships to their invertebrate hosts. A phoretic worm rides on the host until it finds a favorable environment, and then leaves. A necromenic worm waits for the host to die, and lives on the bacteria which thrive in the dead animal. Many species are capable of both phoretic and necromenic lifestyles.

== Species ==
Cladogram of Caenorhabditis species

- Caenorhabditis
  - - Elegans
      - C. inopinata
      - C. sp. 35
      - Elegans
        - - - - - C. briggsae
                - C. nigoni
              - C. sinica
            - - C. latens
              - C. remanei
          - - C. wallacei
            - C. tropicalis
          - - C. brenneri
            - C. doughertyi
        - C. elegans
      - Japonica
        - - - - - C. nouraguensis
                - C. yunquensis
              - C. macrosperma
            - - C. afra
              - C. imperialis
          - C. japonica
        - C. kamaaina
    - Drosophilae
      - - - - C. drosophilae
            - C. sp. 2
          - - - C. angaria
              - C. castelli
            - C. sp. 8
        - - C. portoensis
          - C. virilis
      - C. guadeloupensis
  - - C. monodelphis
    - C. plicata

Species of Caenorhabditis: C. nigoni is the sister species of C. briggsae while C. elegans stays alone, basal in the 'Elegans' group.

There are about 50 known species in this genus, some of them not yet formally described and named, in spite of 15 of the species being named in one article 2014. Based on ITS2 sequence comparison, these can be grouped like this:

- 'Elegans' supergroup
    - Caenorhabditis inopinata - Prior to 2017 referred to as C. sp. 34. A gonochoristic (male-female) species was isolated from figs and fig wasps. Its genome is being sequenced at the University of Miyazaki
    - Caenorhabditis sp. 35
  - 'Elegans' group
    - Caenorhabditis elegans - genome sequenced in 1998 by Washington University in St. Louis and the Wellcome Trust Sanger Institute to 6x coverage This is currently the most studied species in the genus, and likely in the phylum. C. elegans are mostly XX protandrous hermaphrodites that fertilize using their own sperm or the sperm of occasional XO males.
    - Caenorhabditis briggsae - genome sequence finished 2003 at Washington University in St. Louis. C. briggsae is the second-best studied species in the genus. While C. briggsae are also mostly XX protandrous hermaphrodites, they are not the closest relatives to C. elegans, and the hermaphroditic reproductive strategy of these species, as well as C. tropicalis, is an example of convergent evolution. The evolutionary distance between C. briggsae and C. elegans is similar to that of humans and mice. C. nigoni is the closest relative of C. briggsae, and the two species can occasionally produce somewhat fertile hybrids.
    - Caenorhabditis remanei - genome sequenced by WashU GSC. More closely related to C. briggsae than C. elegans, C. remanei is a gonochoristic (male-female obligate) species in the Elegans group. In the past, there was some confusion about placement of strains between C. remanei, C. vulgaris (now seen as a subspecies of C. remanei) and C. brenneri.
    - Caenorhabditis brenneri - (prior to 2007 referred to as C. sp 4, C. sp CB5161, and C. sp PB2801) - genome sequenced by WashU GSC. This gonochoristic species is found in the Elegans group, closer to C. briggsae than C. elegans.
    - Caenorhabditis nigoni - Prior to 2014 referred to as C. sp. 9
    - Caenorhabditis doughertyi - Prior to 2014 referred to as C. sp. 10
    - Caenorhabditis tropicalis - Prior to 2014 referred to as C. sp. 11 Similar to C. elegans and C. briggsae, C. tropicalis populations are made up of XX protandrous hermaphrodites and X0 males. These three species are not each other's closest relatives
    - Caenorhabditis wallacei - Prior to 2014 referred to as C. sp. 16
    - Caenorhabditis latens - Prior to 2014 referred to as C. sp. 23
    - Caenorhabditis sinica - Prior to 2014 referred as C. sp. 5
  - 'Japonica' group
    - Caenorhabditis japonica - genome being sequenced by WashU GSC. This gonochoristic species is found in the Japonica group, the sister clade to the Elegans group. In the wild, this species is found non-parasitically associated with the burrower bugs Parastrachia japonensis and may be able to enter the dauer stage regardless of food and crowding conditions.
    - Caenorhabditis afra - (also referred to as C. sp. 7, C. sp. JU1199 and C. sp. JU1286). This gonochoristic (male-female) species was isolated by Matthias Herrmann in Begoro, Ghana, Africa in 2007. Its genome is being sequenced at WashU.
    - Caenorhabditis imperialis - Prior to 2014 referred to as C. sp. 14
    - Caenorhabditis kamaaina - Prior to 2014 referred to as C. sp. 15
    - Caenorhabditis nouraguensis - Prior to 2014 referred to as C. sp. 17
    - Caenorhabditis macrosperma - Prior to 2014 referred to as C. sp. 18
    - Caenorhabditis yunquensis - Prior to 2014 referred to as C. sp. 19
- 'Drosophilae' supergroup : group of species generally found on rotten fruits and transported by Drosophila flies
    - Caenorhabditis angaria - (prior to 2011 referred to as C. sp. 2, C. sp. 3, and C. sp. PS1010) - genome sequenced at the California Institute of Technology in 2010. This gonochoristic species, found in the Angaria group of the Drosophilae super-group, has distinct morphology and behavior compared to C. elegans. Notably, C. angaria males exhibit a spiral mating behavior. Its divergence from C. elegans is similar to the distance between humans and fish. C. castelli is its closest relative, and the two species can produce F1 hybrids.
    - Caenorhabditis castelli - Prior to 2014 referred to as C. sp. 12
    - Caenorhabditis drosophilae
    - Caenorhabditis guadeloupensis - Prior to 2014 referred to as C. sp. 20
    - Caenorhabditis portoensis - Prior to 2014 referred to as C. sp. 6
    - Caenorhabditis virilis - Prior to 2014 referred to as C. sp. 13
    - Caenorhabditis sp. 8
- basal
    - Caenorhabditis monodelphis - Prior to 2017 referred to as Caenorhabditis sp. 1
    - Caenorhabditis plicata - genome being sequenced by the University of Edinburgh.

== Other phylogenetic studies ==
The Caenorhabditis species group with the 'Protorhabditis' group, containing species in the genera Protorhabditis, Diploscapter and Prodontorhabditis, on the one hand, and with Oscheius species, on the other hand, to form the 'Eurhabditis' group of Rhabditidae genera.

Members of Caenorhabditis exclusively share 39 conserved signature indels that are found in the conserved regions of various proteins, such as the Rab44 protein and a poly ADP-ribose glycohydrolase protein (PARG-1), and are specifically located on surface-exposed loops. These molecular markers help distinguish this genus from all other species, and their presence on surface-exposed loops suggest implications in protein-protein or protein-ligand interactions.
