= Caenorhabditis plicata =

Scientific classification
- Kingdom: Animalia
- Phylum: Nematoda
- Class: Chromadorea
- Order: Rhabditida
- Family: Rhabditidae
- Genus: Caenorhabditis
- Species: C. plicata

Binomial name
- Caenorhabditis plicata (Völk, 1950)

Synonyms
- Rhabditis plicata Volk, 1950

Species of worm

Caenorhabditis plicata is a species of nematodes in the genus Caenorhabditis. It was described on carrion in Germany and is phoretic on carrion visiting beetles.

Its genome was sequenced by the University of Edinburgh.

C. plicata groups with C. sp. 1 (Caenorhabditis monodelphis) outside either the 'Drosophilae' or the 'Elegans' supergroups in phylogenetic studies.
