= Caenorhabditis sp. 35 =

Scientific classification
- Domain: Eukaryota
- Kingdom: Animalia
- Phylum: Nematoda
- Class: Chromadorea
- Order: Rhabditida
- Family: Rhabditidae
- Genus: Caenorhabditis
- Species: C. sp. 35

Binomial name
- Caenorhabditis sp. 35

Species of roundworm

Caenorhabditis sp. 35 is a yet unnamed species of nematodes in the genus Caenorhabditis. Two isolates were discovered in 2013 by N. Kanzaki from Banda Aceh, Indonesia, associated with Ficus hispida.

Genetic studies show that it is basal in the 'Elegans' supergroup with C. inopinata.
