= Caenorhabditis latens =

Scientific classification
- Kingdom: Animalia
- Phylum: Nematoda
- Class: Chromadorea
- Order: Rhabditida
- Family: Rhabditidae
- Genus: Caenorhabditis
- Species: C. latens

Binomial name
- Caenorhabditis latens Félix, Marie-Anne; Braendle, Christian; Cutter, Asher D., 2014

Synonyms
- C. sp. 23

Species of roundworm

Caenorhabditis latens is a species of nematode. Prior to 2014, it was referred to as Caenorhabditis sp. 23. The reference strain VX88 was isolated from soil near a lotus pond, and strain VX85 was isolated from soil under rotten grass in Juifeng Village, Wuhan City, Hubei Province, China.

This species groups with C. remanei in the 'Elegans' supergroup in phylogenetic studies.
