= Caenorhabditis brenneri =

Scientific classification
- Domain: Eukaryota
- Kingdom: Animalia
- Phylum: Nematoda
- Class: Chromadorea
- Order: Rhabditida
- Family: Rhabditidae
- Genus: Caenorhabditis
- Species: C. brenneri

Binomial name
- Caenorhabditis brenneri Sudhaus & Kiontke, 2007

Species of roundworm

Caenorhabditis brenneri is a small nematode, closely related to the model organism Caenorhabditis elegans. Its genome is being sequenced by Washington University in St. Louis Genome Sequencing Center. This species has previously been referred to as C. sp 4 and Caenorhabditis sp. CB5161, but was recently formally described and given its scientific name. This name is in honor of Sydney Brenner, recognizing his pioneering role in starting active research in the field of C. elegans biology and development.

This species can hybridize with Caenorhabditis remanei, but only when C. remanei males mate with C. brenneri females, and then the offspring are apparently sterile.

This species groups with C. doughertyi in the 'Elegans' supergroup in phylogenetic studies.
