= Caenorhabditis guadeloupensis =

Scientific classification
- Domain: Eukaryota
- Kingdom: Animalia
- Phylum: Nematoda
- Class: Chromadorea
- Order: Rhabditida
- Family: Rhabditidae
- Genus: Caenorhabditis
- Species: C. guadeloupensis

Binomial name
- Caenorhabditis guadeloupensis Félix, Marie-Anne; Braendle, Christian; Cutter, Asher D., 2014

Synonyms
- Caenorhabditis sp. 20

Species of roundworm

Caenorhabditis guadeloupensis is a species of nematodes, in the same genus as the model organism Caenorhabditis elegans. This species was collected from rotten Heliconia flowers on the Soufrière Forest trail, in Guadeloupe, France.

This species is at the basis of the 'Drosophilae' supergroup in phylogenetic studies.
