= Model organism =

Organisms used to study biology across species

Any living organism that scientists use to study biology.

Escherichia coli is a gram-negative prokaryotic model organism

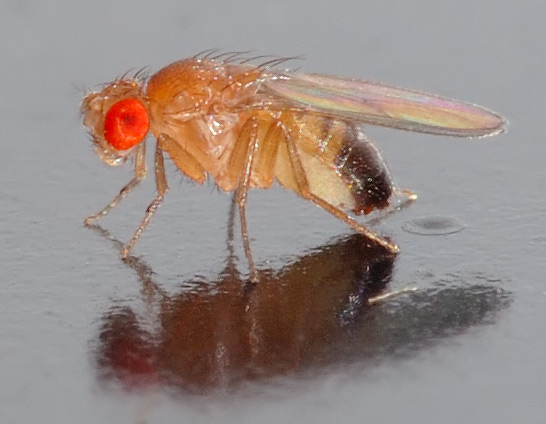
Drosophila melanogaster, one of the most famous subjects for genetics experiments

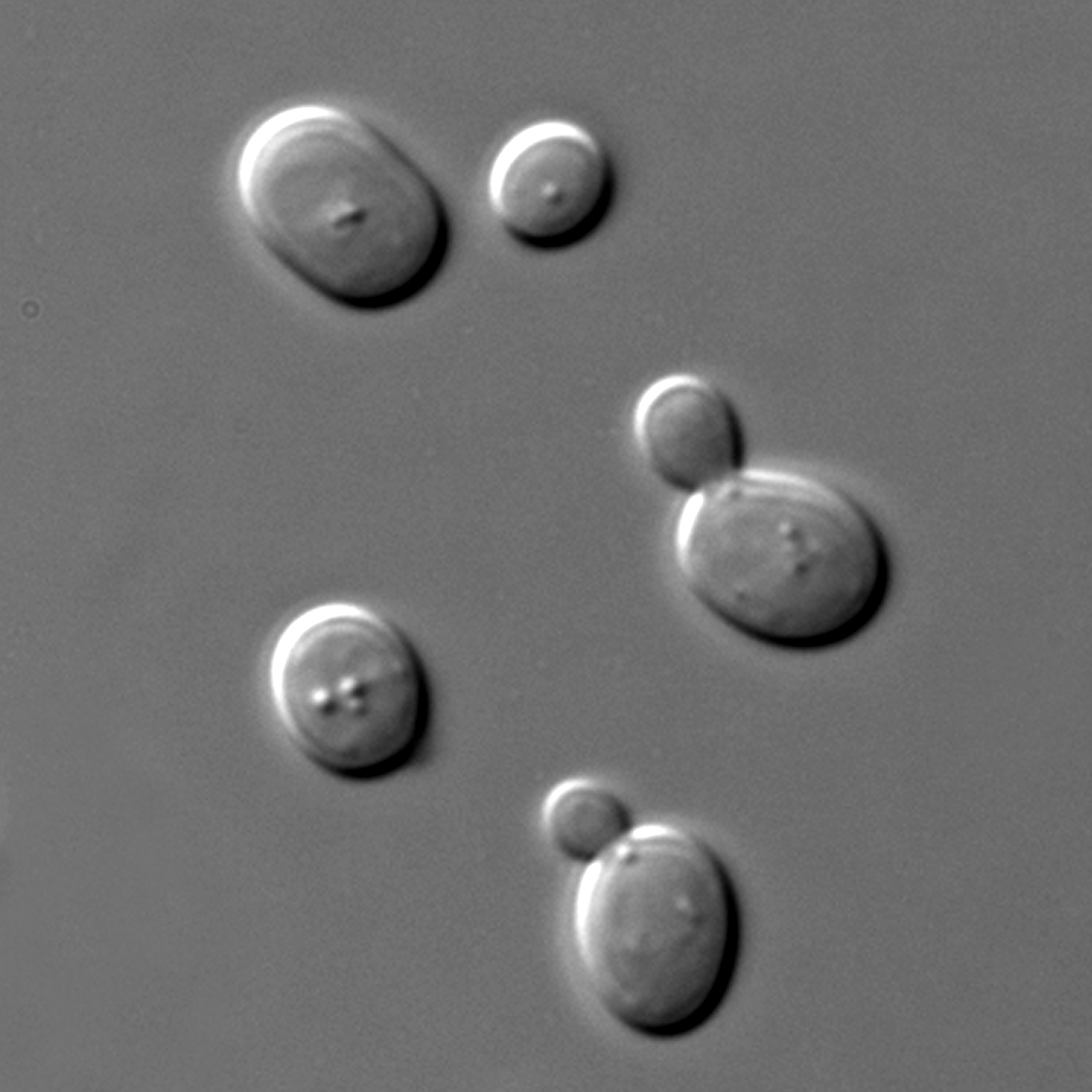
Saccharomyces cerevisiae, one of the most intensively studied eukaryotic model organisms in molecular and cell biology

A model organism is a non-human species that is extensively studied to understand particular biological phenomena, with the expectation that discoveries made in the model organism will provide insight into the workings of other organisms. Model organisms are widely used to research human disease when human experimentation would be unfeasible or unethical. This strategy is made possible by the common descent of all living organisms, and the conservation of metabolic and developmental pathways and genetic material over the course of evolution.

Research using animal models has been central to most of the achievements of modern medicine. It has contributed most of the basic knowledge in fields such as human physiology and biochemistry, and has played significant roles in fields such as neuroscience and infectious disease. The results have included the near-eradication of polio and the development of organ transplantation, and have benefited both humans and animals. From 1910 to 1927, Thomas Hunt Morgan's work with the fruit fly Drosophila melanogaster identified chromosomes as the vector of inheritance for genes, and Eric Kandel wrote that Morgan's discoveries "helped transform biology into an experimental science". Research in model organisms led to further medical advances, such as the production of the diphtheria antitoxin and the 1922 discovery of insulin and its use in treating diabetes, which had previously meant death. Modern general anaesthetics such as halothane were also developed through studies on model organisms, and are necessary for modern, complex surgical operations. Other 20th-century medical advances and treatments that relied on research performed in animals include organ transplant techniques, the heart-lung machine, antibiotics, and the whooping cough vaccine.

In researching human disease, model organisms allow for better understanding the disease process without the added risk of harming an actual human. The species of the model organism is usually chosen so that it reacts to disease or its treatment in a way that resembles human physiology, even though care must be taken when generalizing from one organism to another. However, many drugs, treatments and cures for human diseases are developed in part with the guidance of animal models. Treatments for animal diseases have also been developed, including for rabies, anthrax, glanders, feline immunodeficiency virus (FIV), tuberculosis, Texas cattle fever, classical swine fever (hog cholera), heartworm, and other parasitic infections. Animal experimentation continues to be required for biomedical research, and is used with the aim of solving medical problems such as Alzheimer's disease, AIDS, multiple sclerosis, spinal cord injury, many headaches, and other conditions in which there is no useful in vitro model system available.

Model organisms are drawn from all three domains of life, as well as viruses. One of the first model systems for molecular biology was the bacterium Escherichia coli (E. coli), a common constituent of the human digestive system. The protist T. brucei has become a model organism. The mouse (Mus musculus) has been used extensively as a model organism and is associated with many important biological discoveries of the 20th and 21st centuries. Other examples include baker's yeast (Saccharomyces cerevisiae), the T4 phage virus, the fruit fly Drosophila melanogaster, the flowering plant Arabidopsis thaliana, and guinea pigs (Cavia porcellus). Several of the bacterial viruses (bacteriophage) that infect E. coli also have been very useful for the study of gene structure and gene regulation (e.g. phages Lambda and T4). Disease models are divided into three categories: homologous animals have the same causes, symptoms and treatment options as would humans who have the same disease, isomorphic animals share the same symptoms and treatments, and predictive models are similar to a particular human disease in only a couple of aspects, but are useful in isolating and making predictions about mechanisms of a set of disease features.

== History ==
The use of animals in research dates back to ancient Greece, with Aristotle (384–322 BCE) and Erasistratus (304–258 BCE) among the first to perform experiments on living animals. Discoveries in the 18th and 19th centuries included Antoine Lavoisier's use of a guinea pig in a calorimeter to prove that respiration was a form of combustion, and Louis Pasteur's demonstration of the germ theory of disease in the 1880s using anthrax in sheep.

Research using animal models has been central to most of the achievements of modern medicine. It has contributed most of the basic knowledge in fields such as human physiology and biochemistry, and has played significant roles in fields such as neuroscience and infectious disease. For example, the results have included the near-eradication of polio and the development of organ transplantation, and have benefited both humans and animals. From 1910 to 1927, Thomas Hunt Morgan's work with the fruit fly Drosophila melanogaster identified chromosomes as the vector of inheritance for genes. Drosophila became one of the first, and for some time the most widely used, model organisms, and Eric Kandel wrote that Morgan's discoveries "helped transform biology into an experimental science". D. melanogaster remains one of the most widely used eukaryotic model organisms. During the same time period, studies on mouse genetics in the laboratory of William Ernest Castle in collaboration with Abbie Lathrop led to generation of the DBA ("dilute, brown and non-agouti") inbred mouse strain and the systematic generation of other inbred strains. The mouse has since been used extensively as a model organism and is associated with many important biological discoveries of the 20th and 21st centuries.

In the late 19th century, Emil von Behring isolated the diphtheria toxin and demonstrated its effects in guinea pigs. He went on to develop an antitoxin against diphtheria in animals and then in humans, which resulted in the modern methods of immunization and largely ended diphtheria as a threatening disease. The diphtheria antitoxin is famously commemorated in the Iditarod race, which is modeled after the delivery of antitoxin in the 1925 serum run to Nome. The success of animal studies in producing the diphtheria antitoxin has also been attributed as a cause for the decline of the early 20th-century opposition to animal research in the United States.

Subsequent research in model organisms led to further medical advances, such as Frederick Banting's research in dogs, which determined that the isolates of pancreatic secretion could be used to treat dogs with diabetes. This led to the 1922 discovery of insulin (with John Macleod) and its use in treating diabetes, which had previously meant death. John Cade's research in guinea pigs discovered the anticonvulsant properties of lithium salts, which revolutionized the treatment of bipolar disorder, replacing the previous treatments of lobotomy or electroconvulsive therapy. Modern general anaesthetics, such as halothane and related compounds, were also developed through studies on model organisms, and are necessary for modern, complex surgical operations.

In the 1940s, Jonas Salk used rhesus monkey studies to isolate the most virulent forms of the polio virus, which led to his creation of a polio vaccine. The vaccine, which was made publicly available in 1955, reduced the incidence of polio 15-fold in the United States over the following five years. Albert Sabin improved the vaccine by passing the polio virus through animal hosts, including monkeys; the Sabin vaccine was produced for mass consumption in 1963, and had virtually eradicated polio in the United States by 1965. It has been estimated that developing and producing the vaccines required the use of 100,000 rhesus monkeys, with 65 doses of vaccine produced from each monkey. Sabin wrote in 1992, "Without the use of animals and human beings, it would have been impossible to acquire the important knowledge needed to prevent much suffering and premature death not only among humans, but also among animals."

Other 20th-century medical advances and treatments that relied on research performed in animals include organ transplant techniques, the heart-lung machine, antibiotics, and the whooping cough vaccine. Treatments for animal diseases have also been developed, including for rabies, anthrax, glanders, feline immunodeficiency virus (FIV), tuberculosis, Texas cattle fever, classical swine fever (hog cholera), heartworm, and other parasitic infections. Animal experimentation continues to be required for biomedical research, and is used with the aim of solving medical problems such as Alzheimer's disease, AIDS, multiple sclerosis, spinal cord injury, many headaches, and other conditions in which there is no useful in vitro model system available.

== Selection ==
Models are those organisms with a wealth of biological data that make them attractive to study as examples for other species and/or natural phenomena that are more difficult to study directly. Continual research on these organisms focuses on a wide variety of experimental techniques and goals from many different levels of biology—from ecology, behavior and biomechanics, down to the tiny functional scale of individual tissues, organelles and proteins. Inquiries about the DNA of organisms are classed as genetic models (with short generation times, such as the fruitfly and nematode worm), experimental models, and genomic parsimony models, investigating pivotal position in the evolutionary tree. Historically, model organisms include a handful of species with extensive genomic research data, such as the NIH model organisms.

Often, model organisms are chosen on the basis that they are amenable to experimental manipulation. This usually will include characteristics such as short life-cycle, techniques for genetic manipulation (inbred strains, stem cell lines, and methods of transformation) and non-specialist living requirements. Sometimes, the genome arrangement facilitates the sequencing of the model organism's genome, for example, by being very compact or having a low proportion of junk DNA (e.g. yeast, arabidopsis, or pufferfish).

When researchers look for an organism to use in their studies, they look for several traits. Among these are size, generation time, accessibility, manipulation, genetics, conservation of mechanisms, and potential economic benefit. As comparative molecular biology has become more common, some researchers have sought model organisms from a wider assortment of lineages on the tree of life.

=== Phylogeny and genetic relatedness ===
The primary reason for the use of model organisms in research is the evolutionary principle that all organisms share some degree of relatedness and genetic similarity due to common ancestry. The study of taxonomic human relatives, then, can provide a great deal of information about mechanisms and diseases within the human body that can be useful in medicine.

Various phylogenetic trees for vertebrates have been constructed using comparative proteomics, genetics, genomics, as well as the geochemical and fossil record. These estimations tell us that humans and chimpanzees last shared a common ancestor about 6 million years ago (mya). As our closest relatives, chimpanzees have a lot of potential to tell us about mechanisms of disease (and what genes may be responsible for human intelligence). However, chimpanzees are rarely used in research and are protected from highly invasive procedures. Rodents are the most common animal models. Phylogenetic trees estimate that humans and rodents last shared a common ancestor ~80-100mya. Despite this distant split, humans and rodents have far more similarities than they do differences. This is due to the relative stability of large portions of the genome, making the use of vertebrate animals particularly productive.

Genomic data is used to make close comparisons between species and determine relatedness. Humans share about 99% of their genome with chimpanzees (98.7% with bonobos) and over 90% with the mouse. With so much of the genome conserved across species, it is relatively impressive that the differences between humans and mice can be accounted for in a few thousand genes, less than 1% (of ~19,000 total). Scientists have been able to take advantage of these similarities in generating experimental and predictive models of human disease.

== Use ==
There are many model organisms. One of the first model systems for molecular biology was the bacterium Escherichia coli, a common constituent of the human digestive system. Several of the bacterial viruses (bacteriophage) that infect E. coli also have been very useful for the study of gene structure and gene regulation (e.g. phages Lambda and T4). However, it is debated whether bacteriophages should be classified as organisms, because they lack metabolism and depend on functions of the host cells for propagation.

In eukaryotes, several yeasts, particularly Saccharomyces cerevisiae ("baker's" or "budding" yeast), have been widely used in genetics and cell biology, largely because they are quick and easy to grow. The cell cycle in a simple yeast is very similar to the cell cycle in humans and is regulated by homologous proteins. The fruit fly Drosophila melanogaster is studied, again, because it is easy to grow for an animal, has various visible congenital traits and has a polytene (giant) chromosome in its salivary glands that can be examined under a light microscope. The roundworm Caenorhabditis elegans is studied because it has very defined development patterns involving fixed numbers of cells, and it can be rapidly assayed for abnormalities.

== Disease models ==
Animal models serving in research may have an existing, inbred or induced disease or injury that is similar to a human condition. These test conditions are often termed as animal models of disease. The use of animal models allows researchers to investigate disease states in ways which would be inaccessible in a human patient, performing procedures on the non-human animal that imply a level of harm that would not be considered ethical to inflict on a human.

The best models of disease are similar in etiology (mechanism of cause) and phenotype (signs and symptoms) to the human equivalent. However, complex human diseases can often be better understood in a simplified system where individual parts of the disease process are isolated and examined. For instance, behavioral analogues of anxiety or pain in laboratory animals can be used to screen and test new drugs for the treatment of these conditions in humans. A 2000 study found that animal models concorded (coincided on true positives and false negatives) with human toxicity in 71% of cases, with 63% for non-rodents alone and 43% for rodents alone.

In 1987, Davidson et al. suggested that the selection of an animal model for research be based on nine considerations. These include

1) appropriateness as an analog, 2) transferability of information, 3) genetic uniformity of organisms, where applicable, 4) background knowledge of biological properties, 5) cost and availability, 6) generalizability of the results, 7) ease of and adaptability to experimental manipulation, 8) ecological consequences, and 9) ethical implications.

Animal models can be classified as homologous, isomorphic or predictive. Animal models can also be more broadly classified into four categories: 1) experimental, 2) spontaneous, 3) negative, 4) orphan.

Experimental models are most common. These refer to models of disease that resemble human conditions in phenotype or response to treatment but are induced artificially in the laboratory. Some examples include:

- The use of metrazol (pentylenetetrazol) as an animal model of epilepsy
- Induction of mechanical brain injury as an animal model of post-traumatic epilepsy
- Injection of the neurotoxin 6-hydroxydopamine to dopaminergic parts of the basal ganglia as an animal model of Parkinson's disease.
- Immunisation with an auto-antigen to induce an immune response to model autoimmune diseases such as Experimental autoimmune encephalomyelitis
- Occlusion of the middle cerebral artery as an animal model of ischemic stroke
- Injection of blood in the basal ganglia of mice as a model for hemorrhagic stroke
- Sepsis and septic shock induction by impairing the integrity of barrier tissues, administering live pathogens or toxins
- Infecting animals with pathogens to reproduce human infectious diseases
- Injecting animals with agonists or antagonists of various neurotransmitters to reproduce human mental disorders
- Using ionizing radiation to cause tumors
- Using gene transfer to cause tumors
- Implanting animals with tumors to test and develop treatments using ionizing radiation
- Genetically selected (such as in diabetic mice also known as NOD mice)
- Various animal models for screening of drugs for the treatment of glaucoma
- The use of the ovariectomized rat in osteoporosis research
- Use of Plasmodium yoelii as a model of human malaria

Spontaneous models refer to diseases that are analogous to human conditions that occur naturally in the animal being studied. These models are rare, but informative. Negative models essentially refer to control animals, which are useful for validating an experimental result. Orphan models refer to diseases for which there is no human analog and occur exclusively in the species studied.

The increase in knowledge of the genomes of non-human primates and other mammals that are genetically close to humans is allowing the production of genetically engineered animal tissues, organs and even animal species which express human diseases, providing a more robust model of human diseases in an animal model.

Animal models observed in the sciences of psychology and sociology are often termed animal models of behavior. It is difficult to build an animal model that perfectly reproduces the symptoms of depression in patients. Depression, as other mental disorders, consists of endophenotypes that can be reproduced independently and evaluated in animals. An ideal animal model offers an opportunity to understand molecular, genetic and epigenetic factors that may lead to depression. By using animal models, the underlying molecular alterations and the causal relationship between genetic or environmental alterations and depression can be examined, which would afford a better insight into the pathology of depression. In addition, animal models of depression are indispensable for identifying novel therapies for depression.

== Important model organisms ==
Model organisms are drawn from all three domains of life, as well as viruses. The most widely studied prokaryotic model organism is Escherichia coli (E. coli), which has been intensively investigated for over 60 years. It is a common, gram-negative gut bacterium which can be grown and cultured easily and inexpensively in a laboratory setting. It is the most widely used organism in molecular genetics, and is an important species in the fields of biotechnology and microbiology, where it has served as the host organism for the majority of work with recombinant DNA.

Simple model eukaryotes include baker's yeast (Saccharomyces cerevisiae) and fission yeast (Schizosaccharomyces pombe), both of which share many characters with higher cells, including those of humans. For instance, many cell division genes that are critical for the development of cancer have been discovered in yeast. Chlamydomonas reinhardtii, a unicellular green alga with well-studied genetics, is used to study photosynthesis and motility. C. reinhardtii has many known and mapped mutants and expressed sequence tags, and there are advanced methods for genetic transformation and selection of genes. Dictyostelium discoideum is used in molecular biology and genetics, and is studied as an example of cell communication, differentiation, and programmed cell death.

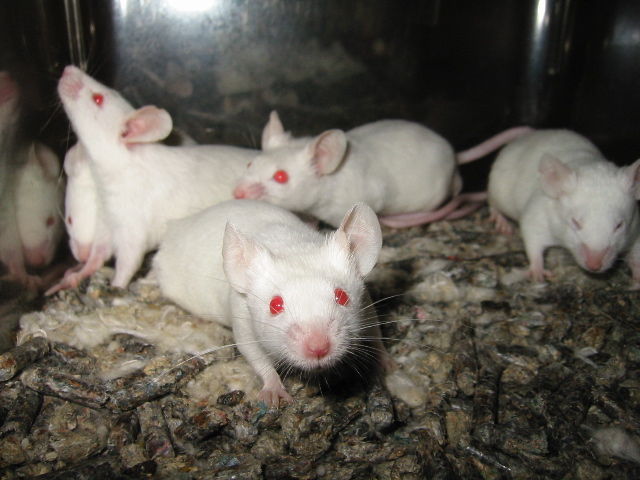
Laboratory mice, widely used in medical research

Among invertebrates, the fruit fly Drosophila melanogaster is famous as the subject of genetics experiments by Thomas Hunt Morgan and others. They are easily raised in the lab, with rapid generations, high fecundity, few chromosomes, and easily induced observable mutations. The nematode Caenorhabditis elegans is used for understanding the genetic control of development and physiology. It was first proposed as a model for neuronal development by Sydney Brenner in 1963, and has been extensively used in many different contexts since then. C. elegans was the first multicellular organism whose genome was completely sequenced, and as of 2012, the only organism to have its connectome (neuronal "wiring diagram") completed.

Arabidopsis thaliana is currently the most popular model plant. Its small stature and short generation time facilitates rapid genetic studies, and many phenotypic and biochemical mutants have been mapped. A. thaliana was the first plant to have its genome sequenced.

Among vertebrates, guinea pigs (Cavia porcellus) were used by Robert Koch and other early bacteriologists as a host for bacterial infections, becoming a byword for "laboratory animal", but are less commonly used today. The classic model vertebrate is currently the mouse (Mus musculus). Many inbred strains exist, as well as lines selected for particular traits, often of medical interest, e.g. body size, obesity, muscularity, and voluntary wheel-running behavior. The rat (Rattus norvegicus) is particularly useful as a toxicology model, and as a neurological model and source of primary cell cultures, owing to the larger size of organs and suborganellar structures relative to the mouse, while eggs and embryos from Xenopus tropicalis and Xenopus laevis (African clawed frog) are used in developmental biology, cell biology, toxicology, and neuroscience. Likewise, the zebrafish (Danio rerio) has a nearly transparent body during early development, which provides unique visual access to the animal's internal anatomy during this time period. Zebrafish are used to study development, toxicology and toxicopathology, specific gene function and roles of signaling pathways.

Other important model organisms and some of their uses include: T4 phage (viral infection), Tetrahymena thermophila (intracellular processes), maize (transposons), hydras (regeneration and morphogenesis), cats (neurophysiology), chickens (development), dogs (respiratory and cardiovascular systems, and more recently aging, through cohort studies of pet dogs such as the Dog Aging Project), Nothobranchius furzeri (aging), non-human primates such as the rhesus macaque and chimpanzee (hepatitis, HIV, Parkinson's disease, cognition, and vaccines), and ferrets (SARS-CoV-2)

=== Selected model organisms ===
The organisms below have become model organisms because they facilitate the study of certain characteristics or because of their genetic accessibility. For example, E. coli was one of the first organisms for which genetic techniques such as transformation or genetic manipulation has been developed.

The genomes of all model species have been sequenced, including their mitochondrial/chloroplast genomes. Model organism databases exist to provide researchers with a portal from which to download sequences (DNA, RNA, or protein) or to access functional information on specific genes, for example the sub-cellular localization of the gene product or its physiological role.

	Model Organism	Common name	Informal classification	Usage (examples)
Virus	Phi X 174	ΦX174	Bacteriophage	evolution
Prokaryotes	Escherichia coli	E. coli	Bacteria	bacterial genetics, metabolism
Prokaryotes	Pseudomonas fluorescens	P. fluorescens	Bacteria	evolution, adaptive radiation
Eukaryotes, unicellular	Dictyostelium discoideum		Amoeba	immunology, host–pathogen interactions
Eukaryotes, unicellular	Saccharomyces cerevisiae	Brewer's yeast Baker's yeast	Yeast	cell division, organelles, etc.
Eukaryotes, unicellular	Schizosaccharomyces pombe	Fission yeast	Yeast	cell cycle, cytokinesis, chromosome biology, telomeres, DNA metabolism, cytoskeleton organization, industrial applications
Eukaryotes, unicellular	Chlamydomonas reinhardtii		Green algae	hydrogen production
Eukaryotes, unicellular	Tetrahymena thermophila, T. pyriformis		Ciliate	education, biomedical research
Eukaryotes, unicellular	Emiliania huxleyi		Phytoplankton	surface sea temperature
Plants	Arabidopsis thaliana	Thale cress	Flowering plant	population genetics
Plants	Physcomitrella patens	Spreading earthmoss	Moss	molecular farming
Plants	Populus trichocarpa	Balsam poplar	Tree	drought tolerance, lignin biosynthesis, wood formation, plant biology, morphology, genetics, and ecology
Animals, nonvertebrate	Caenorhabditis elegans	Nematode, Roundworm	Worm	differentiation, development
Animals, nonvertebrate	Drosophila melanogaster	Fruit fly	Insect	developmental biology, human brain degenerative disease
Animals, nonvertebrate	Callosobruchus maculatus	Cowpea Weevil	Insect	developmental biology
Animals, vertebrate	Danio rerio	Zebrafish	Fish	embryonic development
Animals, vertebrate	Fundulus heteroclitus	Mummichog	Fish	effect of hormones on behavior
Animals, vertebrate	Nothobranchius furzeri	Turquoise killifish	Fish	aging, disease, evolution
Animals, vertebrate	Oryzias latipes	Japanese rice fish	Fish	fish biology, sex determination
Animals, vertebrate	Anolis carolinensis	Carolina anole	Reptile	reptile biology, evolution
Animals, vertebrate	Mus musculus	House mouse	Mammal	disease model for humans
Animals, vertebrate	Gallus gallus / G. g. domesticus	Red junglefowl / chicken	Bird	embryological development and organogenesis
Animals, vertebrate	Taeniopygia guttata	Australian zebra finch	Bird	vocal learning, neurobiology
Animals, vertebrate	Xenopus laevis Xenopus tropicalis	African clawed frog Western clawed frog	Amphibian	embryonic development

== Limitations ==
Many animal models serving as test subjects in biomedical research, such as rats and mice, may be selectively sedentary, obese and glucose intolerant. This may confound their use to model human metabolic processes and diseases as these can be affected by dietary energy intake and exercise. Similarly, there are differences between the immune systems of model organisms and humans that lead to significantly altered responses to stimuli, although the underlying principles of genome function may be the same. The impoverished environments inside standard laboratory cages deny research animals of the mental and physical challenges are necessary for healthy emotional development. Without day-to-day variety, risks and rewards, and complex environments, some have argued that animal models are irrelevant models of human experience.

Mice differ from humans in several immune properties: mice are more resistant to some toxins than humans; have a lower total neutrophil fraction in the blood, a lower neutrophil enzymatic capacity, lower activity of the complement system, and a different set of pentraxins involved in the inflammatory process; and lack genes for important components of the immune system, such as IL-8, IL-37, TLR10, ICAM-3, etc. Laboratory mice reared in specific-pathogen-free (SPF) conditions usually have a rather immature immune system with a deficit of memory T cells. These mice may have limited diversity of the microbiota, which directly affects the immune system and the development of pathological conditions. Moreover, persistent virus infections (for example, herpesviruses) are activated in humans, but not in SPF mice, with septic complications and may change the resistance to bacterial coinfections. "Dirty" mice are possibly better suitable for mimicking human pathologies. In addition, inbred mouse strains are used in the overwhelming majority of studies, while the human population is heterogeneous, pointing to the importance of studies in interstrain hybrid, outbred, and nonlinear mice.

=== Unintended bias ===
Some studies suggests that inadequate published data in animal testing may result in irreproducible research, with missing details about how experiments are done omitted from published papers or differences in testing that may introduce bias. Examples of hidden bias include a 2014 study from McGill University in Montreal, Canada which suggests that mice handled by men rather than women showed higher stress levels. Another study in 2016 suggested that gut microbiomes in mice may have an impact upon scientific research.

=== Alternatives ===
Ethical concerns, as well as the cost, maintenance and relative inefficiency of animal research has encouraged development of alternative methods for the study of disease. Cell culture, or in vitro studies, provide an alternative that preserves the physiology of the living cell, but does not require the sacrifice of an animal for mechanistic studies. Human, inducible pluripotent stem cells can also elucidate new mechanisms for understanding cancer and cell regeneration. Imaging studies (such as MRI or PET scans) enable non-invasive study of human subjects. Recent advances in genetics and genomics can identify disease-associated genes, which can be targeted for therapies.

Many biomedical researchers argue that there is no substitute for a living organism when studying complex interactions in disease pathology or treatments.

== Ethics ==
Debate about the ethical use of animals in research dates at least as far back as 1822 when the British Parliament under pressure from British and Indian intellectuals enacted the first law for animal protection preventing cruelty to cattle. This was followed by the Cruelty to Animals Act 1835 and the Cruelty to Animals Act 1849, which criminalized ill-treating, over-driving, and torturing animals. In 1876, under pressure from the National Anti-Vivisection Society, the Cruelty to Animals Act 1849 was amended to include regulations governing the use of animals in research. This new act stipulated that 1) experiments must be proven absolutely necessary for instruction, or to save or prolong human life; 2) animals must be properly anesthetized; and 3) animals must be killed as soon as the experiment is over. Today, these three principles are central to the laws and guidelines governing the use of animals and research. In the U.S., the Animal Welfare Act of 1970 (see also Laboratory Animal Welfare Act) set standards for animal use and care in research. This law is enforced by APHIS's Animal Care program.

In academic settings in which NIH funding is used for animal research, institutions are governed by the NIH Office of Laboratory Animal Welfare (OLAW). At each site, OLAW guidelines and standards are upheld by a local review board called the Institutional Animal Care and Use Committee (IACUC). All laboratory experiments involving living animals are reviewed and approved by this committee. In addition to proving the potential for benefit to human health, minimization of pain and distress, and timely and humane euthanasia, experimenters must justify their protocols based on the principles of Replacement, Reduction and Refinement.

Replacement refers to efforts to engage alternatives to animal use. This includes the use of computer models, non-living tissues and cells, and replacement of "higher-order" animals (primates and mammals) with "lower" order animals (e.g. cold-blooded animals, invertebrates) wherever possible.

Reduction refers to efforts to minimize the number of animals used in experiments, including avoiding unnecessary replication, and determining sample size via statistical power calculations so that the smallest number of animals necessary yields scientifically valid results.

Refinement refers to efforts to make experimental design as painless and efficient as possible—to minimize pain, suffering, distress or lasting harm—by improving procedures, husbandry, analgesia, humane endpoints, and animal care.

== See also ==
- Animals in space
- Animal testing
- Animal testing on invertebrates
- Animal testing on rodents
- Cellular model (numerical), e.g., Mycoplasma genitalium.
- Ensembl genome database of model organisms
- Generic Model Organism Database
- Genome project
- History of animal testing
- History of model organisms
- History of research on Arabidopsis thaliana
- History of research on Caenorhabditis elegans
- Mouse models of breast cancer metastasis
- Mouse model of colorectal and intestinal cancer
- RefSeq - the Reference Sequence database
