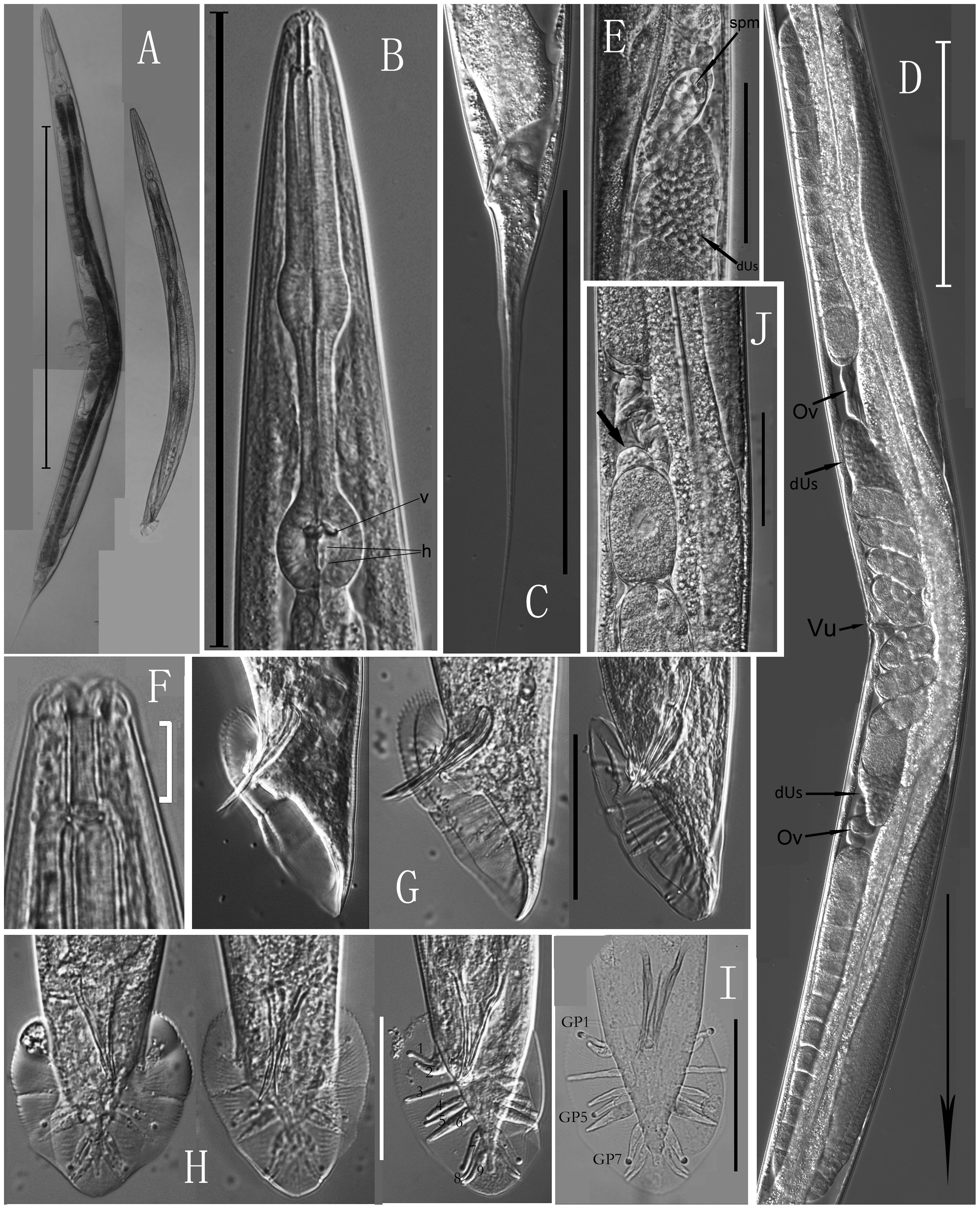

Scientific classification
- Kingdom: Animalia
- Phylum: Nematoda
- Class: Chromadorea
- Order: Rhabditida
- Family: Rhabditidae
- Genus: Caenorhabditis
- Species: C. sinica

Binomial name
- Caenorhabditis sinica Huang et al, 2014

Synonyms
- Caenorhabditis sp. 5

= Caenorhabditis sinica =

Species of roundworm

Caenorhabditis sinica, is a species of Caenorhabditis nematodes, belonging to the Elegans super-group and Elegans group within the genus. It is closely related to several species isolated from the lands adjacent to the Indian and Pacific Oceans, as well as to C. briggsae and C. nigoni. The species was known as "C. sp. 5" prior to 2014. C. sinica is known for having very high genetic diversity in its genome. Like other Caenorhabditis species, C. sinica is a ~1mm long roundworm with a transparent cuticle and that eats bacteria. Wild isolate strains of C. sinica have been collected from various rotting plant tissue substrates in temperate and tropical regions throughout China since its initial isolation in 2005.

== Anatomy ==
Measurements of adult C. sinica returned a mean body length of 1531.9μm for females and 959.81μm for males. The average male size of C. sinica is comparatively larger than males from the model system C. elegans (824.74μm). C. sinica is morphologically distinct from all other Caenorhabditis species within the Elegans group due to the presence of a distinct three-pointed hook on the male precloacal lip, part of the male reproductive structure.

=== Spicule Shape ===
The spicules of C. sinica males consist of a long, slender, pointed, and simple morphology, which is a common feature among Caenorhabditis species outside of the Elegans super-group (with the exception of C. japonica and C. afra).

== Reproduction ==
Like most species of Caenorhabditis, C. sinica demonstrates a gonochoristic mode of reproduction, with populations containing both female and male sexes. This reproductive mode contrasts with C. elegans and C. briggsae which demonstrate an androdioecious mode of reproduction, such that populations primarily include self-fertile hermaphrodites with more rare males.

=== Hybridization ===
In the lab, C. sinica can hybridize with C. nigoni to form young larvae, and can hybridize with C. briggsae to form young deformed female larvae. These hybrids do not yield fertile adults. Hybridization of C. sinica with 9 other Caenorhabditis species was attempted, but was unsuccessful (C. elegans, C. remanei, C. japonica, C. doughertyi, C. afra, C. wallacei, C. brenneri, C. nouraguensis, C. macrosperma) .

== Ecology ==
C. sinica was initially isolated in 2005 from Guangxi, China. Since then, C. sinica has been isolated from rotting fruit, rotting leaves, isopods and soil substrates in temperate and tropical regions in China. Samples have been collected from the Chinese provinces of Guangdong, Hubei, Guangxi, Jiangsu and Zhejiang as well as from Bac Kan, Vietnam. C. sinica has not been isolated from regions outside of East Asia so far.

== Genetics ==
=== Genome size and protein coding genes ===
The genome of C. sinica (strain JU800) consists of approximately 130.76 million base pairs and 34,696 protein coding genes. These genome characteristics make it larger than the C. elegans genome, which consists of around 100.29 million base pairs and 20,326 protein coding genes. Like all known Caenorhabditis species, its genome is partitioned into six chromosomes (five autosomes and one "X" sex chromosome).
