= Caenorhabditis afra =

Scientific classification
- Domain: Eukaryota
- Kingdom: Animalia
- Phylum: Nematoda
- Class: Chromadorea
- Order: Rhabditida
- Family: Rhabditidae
- Genus: Caenorhabditis
- Species: C. afra

Binomial name
- Caenorhabditis afra Felix, Braendle & Cutter, 2014

Synonyms
- Caenorhabditis sp. 7; C. sp. JU1199; C. sp. JU1286

Species of roundworm

Caenorhabditis afra is a species of nematodes in the genus Caenorhabditis. This gonochoristic (male-female) species was isolated by Matthias Herrmann in Begoro, Ghana, Africa in 2007. Its genome is being sequenced at McDonnell Genome Institute at Washington University School of Medicine.

C. afra groups in phylogenetic trees with C. elegans in the 'Elegans' supergroup. This species groups more closely with C. imperialis in the 'Japonica' group, the sister clade to the 'Elegans' group.
