= Caenorhabditis portoensis =

Scientific classification
- Kingdom: Animalia
- Phylum: Nematoda
- Class: Chromadorea
- Order: Rhabditida
- Family: Rhabditidae
- Genus: Caenorhabditis
- Species: C. portoensis

Binomial name
- Caenorhabditis portoensis Félix, Braendle & Cutter, 2014

Strains
- EG4788

Synonyms
- C. sp. 6

Species of roundworm

Caenorhabditis portoensis is a species of nematode in the genus Caenorhabditis. First wild isolate sample (strain EG4788) was found on a rotting apple in Portugal.

Prior to 2014, it was referred to as C. sp. 6. It groups with C. virilis (sp. 13) in the 'Drosophilae' supergroup in phylogenetic studies.
