= Caenorhabditis remanei =

Scientific classification
- Kingdom: Animalia
- Phylum: Nematoda
- Class: Chromadorea
- Order: Rhabditida
- Family: Rhabditidae
- Genus: Caenorhabditis
- Species: C. remanei

Binomial name
- Caenorhabditis remanei (Sudhaus, 1974)

Species of roundworm

Caenorhabditis remanei is a species of nematode found in North America and Europe, and likely lives throughout the temperate world. Several strains have been developed in the laboratory.

== Habitat ==
This 1-mm nematode lives in soil, compost, and similar materials, where it consumes bacteria. It may be found in association with soil-living invertebrates such as snails, slugs, and pill bugs. It lives with the snail Fruticicola sieboldiana in Japan. It has been associated with the isopods Trachelipus rathkii, Armadillidium nasatum, Cylisticus convexus, and Porcellio scaber in Ohio.

== Genetics ==
The genome of this nematode has been sequenced, and it was found to contain about 26,000 genes.

This species groups with C. latens in the 'Elegans' supergroup in phylogenetic studies.

== Mating and reproduction ==
Unlike many other Caenorhabditis species, which are hermaphrodites, C. remanei has both males and females. The male of this species employs a mating plug. This species can hybridize with Caenorhabditis brenneri, but only when C. remanei males mate with C. brenneri females, and then the offspring are apparently sterile.

When C. remanei individuals that were derived from recently isolated natural populations were inbred they showed dramatic reductions in brood size and relative fitness compared to outcrossed individuals. Over time the decline in fitness accumulated and nearly 90% of inbred lines went extinct.
