= Caenorhabditis nouraguensis =

Scientific classification
- Domain: Eukaryota
- Kingdom: Animalia
- Phylum: Nematoda
- Class: Chromadorea
- Order: Rhabditida
- Family: Rhabditidae
- Genus: Caenorhabditis
- Species: C. nouraguensis

Binomial name
- Caenorhabditis nouraguensis Félix, Marie-Anne; Braendle, Christian; Cutter, Asher D., 2014

Synonyms
- Caenorhabditis sp. 17

Species of roundworm

Caenorhabditis nouraguensis is a species of nematodes in the genus Caenorhabditis. Prior to 2014, it was referred to as C. sp. 17. The type isolate was collected in Nouragues, French Guiana.

This species groups with C. yunquensis in the 'Japonica' group, the sister clade to the 'Elegans' group, in the 'Elegans' supergroup.
