= Caenorhabditis kamaaina =

Scientific classification
- Domain: Eukaryota
- Kingdom: Animalia
- Phylum: Nematoda
- Class: Chromadorea
- Order: Rhabditida
- Family: Rhabditidae
- Genus: Caenorhabditis
- Species: C. kamaaina

Binomial name
- Caenorhabditis kamaaina Félix, Marie-Anne; Braendle, Christian; Cutter, Asher D., 2014

Synonyms
- Caenorhabditis sp. 15

Species of roundworm

Caenorhabditis kamaaina is a species of nematodes in the genus Caenorhabditis. Prior to 2014, it was referred to as C. sp. 15. The type isolate was collected in Kauai, Hawaii.

This species is the most basal in the 'Japonica' group, the sister clade to the 'Elegans' group, in the 'Elegans' supergroup.
