= Caenorhabditis virilis =

Scientific classification
- Kingdom: Animalia
- Phylum: Nematoda
- Class: Chromadorea
- Order: Rhabditida
- Family: Rhabditidae
- Genus: Caenorhabditis
- Species: C. virilis

Binomial name
- Caenorhabditis virilis Félix, Braendle & Cutter, 2014

Strains
- JU1528

Synonyms
- C. sp. 13

Species of roundworm

Caenorhabditis virilis is a species of nematodes in the genus of Caenorhabditis. The type isolate JU1528 was collected in an orchard in Orsay, France.

Prior to 2014, it was referred to as C. sp. 13. It groups with C. portoensis (sp. 6) in the 'Drosophilae' supergroup in phylogenetic studies.
