= Caenorhabditis inopinata =

Scientific classification
- Domain: Eukaryota
- Kingdom: Animalia
- Phylum: Nematoda
- Class: Chromadorea
- Order: Rhabditida
- Family: Rhabditidae
- Genus: Caenorhabditis
- Species: C. inopinata

Binomial name
- Caenorhabditis inopinata N. Kanzaki, 2013

Species of roundworm

Caenorhabditis inopinata - prior to 2017 referred to as C. sp. 34. - is a sister species to C. elegans (it is classified in the 'Elegans' supergroup).

The specific epithet comes from the Latin inopinus (“unexpected”).

This gonochoristic (male-female) species was isolated from figs (Ficus septica) and fig wasps in Ishigaki Island, in Japan. It was recovered by N. Kanzaki in 2013. It is a larger species than C. elegans.

Its genome is being sequenced at the University of Miyazaki.
