= History of model organisms =

Organisms used for gaining knowledge

E. coli electron micrograph

Model organisms are specific organisms studied to gain knowledge of other organisms, to generalize both within and between species. Model organisms offer standards for comparison of other organisms. Model organism strains are standardized by inbreeding and cloning, to limit genetic variation and create a precise basis for comparison. Some organisms are experimentally convenient and/or important for their history and research community.

The idea of the model organism first took root in the middle of the 19th century with the work of scientists like Charles Darwin and Gregor Mendel and their respective work on natural selection and the genetics of heredity. Beginning in the early 1900s, laboratory experimentation on Drosophila was expanded to use tobacco mosaic virus, E. coli, C57BL/6 (lab mice), etc. These organisms have led to many advances in the past century.

== Preliminary works on model organisms ==
Some of the first work with what would be considered model organisms started because Gregor Johann Mendel felt that the views of Darwin were insufficient in describing the formation of a new species and he began his work with the pea plants that are so famously known today. In his experimentation to find a method by which Darwin's ideas could be explained he hybridized and cross-bred the peas and found that in so doing he could isolate phenotypic characteristics of the peas. These discoveries made in the 1860s lay dormant for nearly forty years until they were rediscovered in 1900. Mendel's work was then correlated with what was being called chromosomes within the nucleus of each cell. Mendel created a practical guide to breeding and this method has successfully been applied to select for some of the first model organisms of other genus and species such as Guinea pigs, Drosophila (fruit fly), mice, and viruses like the tobacco mosaic virus.

== Modern model organisms ==
=== Drosophila ===
The fruit fly Drosophila melanogaster made the jump from nature to laboratory animal in 1901. At Harvard University, Charles W. Woodworth suggested to William E. Castle that Drosophila might be used for genetical work. Castle, along with his students, then first brought the fly into their labs for experimental use. By 1903 William J. Moenkhaus had brought Drosophila back to his lab at Indiana University Med School. Moenkhaus in turn convinced entomologist Frank E. Lutz that it would be a good organism for the work he was doing at Carnegie Institution's Station for Experimental Evolution at Cold Springs Harbor, Long Island on experimental evolution. Sometime in the year 1906 Drosophila was adopted by the man who would become very well known for his work with the flies, Thomas Hunt Morgan. A man by the name of Jacques Loeb also tried experimentation in mutations of Drosophila independently of Morgan's work during the first decade of the twentieth century.

Thomas Hunt Morgan is considered to be one of the most influential men in experimental biology during the early twentieth century and his work with the Drosophila was extensive. He was one of the first in the field to realize the potential of mapping the chromosomes of Drosophila melanogaster and all known mutants. He would later expand his findings to a comparative study of other species. With careful and painstaking observation he and other "Drosophilists" were able to control for mutations and cross breed for new phenotypes. Through many years of work like this standards of these flies have become quite uniform and are still used in research today.

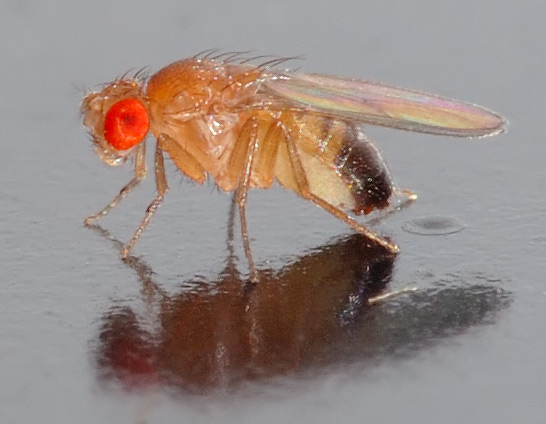
Drosophila, one of the first model organisms to enter the laboratory

=== Microorganisms ===
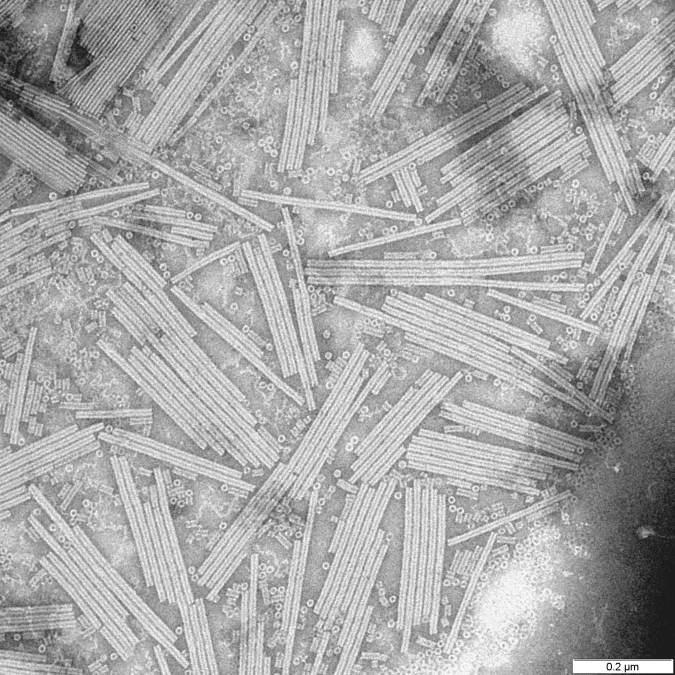
Electron microscope image of tobacco mosaic virus particles

Insects were not the only organisms entering the laboratories as test subjects. Bacteria had also been introduced and with the invention of the electron microscope in 1931 by Ernst Ruska, a whole new field of microbiology was born. This invention allowed microbiologists to see objects that were far too small to be seen by any light microscope and thus viruses which had perplexed biologists of many fields for years, now came under scientific scrutiny. In 1932 Wendell Stanley began a direct competition with Carl G. Vinson to be the first to completely isolate the tobacco mosaic virus (TMV), a virus that had been until then invisibly killing tobacco plants across England. It was Stanley who would accomplish this task first by changing the pH to be more acidic. In doing so he was able to conclude that the virus was either a protein or closely related to one.

There are very important reasons why these new, much smaller organisms such as E. coli made their way into the molecular biologists' laboratories. Organisms like Drosophila and Tribolium were much too large and too complex for the simple quantitative experiments that men like Wendell Stanley wanted to perform. Before the use of these simple organisms molecular biologist had comparatively complex organisms to work with.

Today these viruses, including bacteriophages, are used extensively in genetics. They are critical in helping researchers to produce DNA within bacteria. Tobacco mosaic virus has RNA that stacks itself in a distinctive way that was influenced development of the double-helical model of the structure for DNA.

Bacteriophages (viruses that infect bacteria) have been studied since 1939 as experimental model organisms for understanding numerous fundamental biological processes at the molecular level. The phage group, initially an informal network of biologists centered on Max Delbrück, contributed substantially to bacterial genetics and the origins of molecular biology in the mid-20th century. Studies of bacteriophages led to considerable insight into numerous fundamental biologic problems. Thus understanding was gained on the functions and interactions of the proteins employed in the machinery of DNA replication, DNA repair and recombination, and on how viruses are assembled from protein and nucleic acid components (molecular morphogenesis). Experiments with bacteriophage led to the elucidation of the role of chain terminating codons, and also contributed to the sequence hypothesis, the concept that the amino acid sequence of a protein is specified by the nucleotide sequence of the gene determining the protein.

=== Mice ===
Both the community of insects and the viruses were a good start to the history of model organisms, but there are yet still more players involved. At the turn of the century much biomedical research was being done using animals and especially mammalian bodies to further biologists' understanding of life processes. It was around this time that American humane societies became very involved with preserving the rights of animal and for the first time were beginning to gain public support for this endeavor. At this same time American biology was also going through its own internal reforms. From 1900 to 1910 thirty medical schools were forced to close. During this time of unrest a man named Clarence Cook Little, through a series of luckily timed events, became a researcher at Harvard Medical School and worked on mouse cancers. He began developing large, mutant strain, colonies of mice. Under the charge of Dr. William Castle, Little helped to expand the animal breeding habits in the Bussey laboratory at Harvard. Due to freedom in the way Castle was allowed to run the laboratory and his financial backing by the University they were able to create an extensive program in mammalian genetics.

The mice turned out to be an almost perfect solution for test subjects for mammalian genetic research. The fact that they had been bred by ‘rat fanciers' for hundreds of years allowed for diverse populations of an animal while the public held far less sentiment for these rodents than they did for dogs and cats. Because of social allowance, Little was able to take new ideas of ‘pure genetic strains' merging from plant genetics as well as work with Drosophila and run with them. The idea of inbreeding to achieve this goal of a ‘pure strain' in mice was one that may have created a negative response to the fertility of the mice thus discontinuing the strain. Little achieved his goal of a genetically pure strain of mice by 1911 and published his finding shortly thereafter. He would continue his work with these mice and used his research to demonstrate that inbreeding is an effective way of eliminate variation and served to preserve unique genetic variants. Around this time as well there was much work being done with these mice and cancer and tumor research.

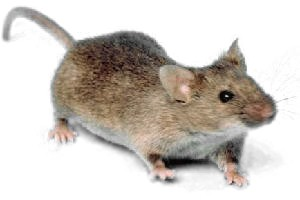
House mouse, the most important mammal model organism

Throughout the 1920s, work continued with these mice as model organisms for research into tumors and genetics. It was during the great depression that this field of study would take its biggest blow. With the economy at rock bottom labs were forced into selling many of their mice just to keep from shutting down. This necessity for funds all but stopped the continuation of these strains of mice. The transition for these laboratories to exporters of massive quantities of mice was one that was rather easily made if there were adequate facilities for their production on site. Eventually in the mid-1930s the market would return and genetics laboratories around the country resumed regular funding and thus continued in the areas of research they had started before the depression. As research into continued, so did the production of mice in places like Jackson Laboratory. Facilities like these were able to produce mice for research facilities around the world. These mice were bred with Mendelian breeding technique of which Little had implemented as standard practice around 1911. This meant that the mice being experimented on were not only the same within the laboratory, but in different laboratories around the world.

The mouse has remained an essential model organism as molecular genetics and genomics have progressed; hence sequencing of a reference mouse genome was completed in 2002.

Comparative genomics have advanced the understanding and reinforced the importance of model organisms. Ones with relatively small and nonrepetitive genomes provide information that can fill gaps when comparing to genomes of other species.

== See also ==
- History of animal testing
- History of research on Arabidopsis thaliana
- History of research on Caenorhabditis elegans
- List of model organisms
- Lists of sequenced genomes

== Sources ==
- Allen, Garland E. Thomas Hunt Morgan: The Man and His Science. Princeton, New Jersey: Princeton University Press, 1978.
- Creager, Angela N.H. The Life of a Virus: Tobacco Mosaic Virus as an Experimental Model, 1930–1965. Chicago: Chicago Press, 2002.
- Dampier, Sir William. A History of Science. New York: The Macmillan Company, 1936.
- "History of the Microscope." Mary Bellis. About: Inventors. 27 November 2006 <>.
- Kohler, Robert E. Lords of the Fly. Chicago: University of Chicago Press, 1994.
- Letters in Applied Microbiology. Yale University Libraries. 25 November 2006 doi:10.1111/j.1472-765X.2006.02040.x.
- Nucleic Acids Research. 2006. Oxford University Press: Oxford Journals. 20 November 2006 <>.
- Rader, Karen. Making Mice: Standardizing Animals for American Biomedical Research. Princeton, NJ: Princeton University Press, 2004.
- “Science at the Museum: Exploration and Discovery.” American Museum of Natural History: Science. American Museum of Natural History. 27 November 2006 <http://www.amnh.org/science/articles/science.php>.
- Watson, James D. The Double Helix. Kingsport, Tennessee: Kingsport Press, 1968.
