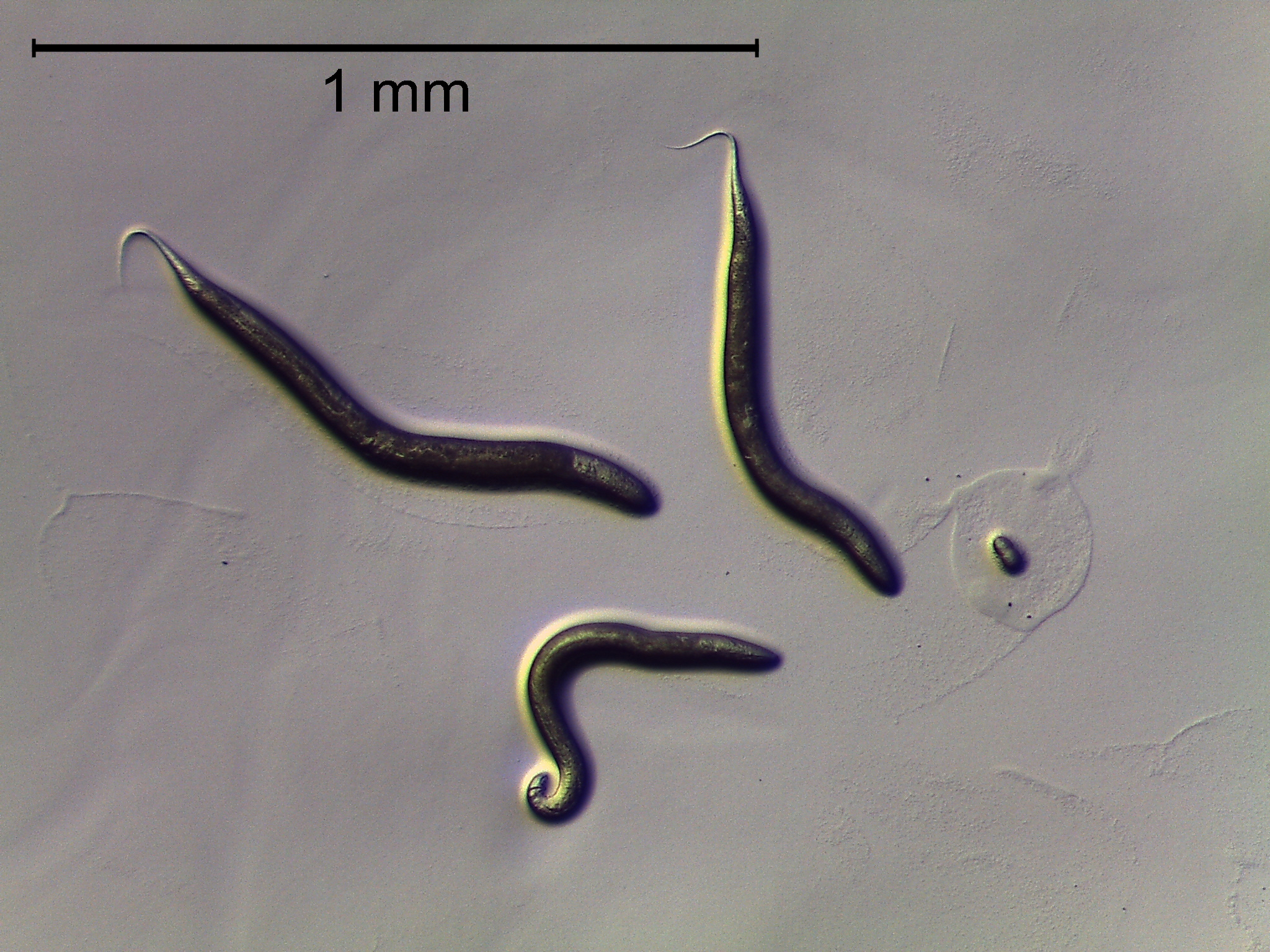
- C. angaria females (top), male (bottom), and embryo (right)

Scientific classification
- Domain: Eukaryota
- Kingdom: Animalia
- Phylum: Nematoda
- Class: Chromadorea
- Order: Rhabditida
- Family: Rhabditidae
- Genus: Caenorhabditis
- Species: C. angaria

Binomial name
- Caenorhabditis angaria Walter Sudhaus, Karin Kiontke, and Robin M. Giblin-Davis

Synonyms
- C. sp. 2; C. sp. 3; C. sp. PS1010

= Caenorhabditis angaria =

Species of roundworm

Caenorhabditis angaria is a small nematode, in the same genus as the model organism Caenorhabditis elegans. The name is from the Latin (angarius "mounted courier") after the tendency to ride weevils. Prior to 2011, the species was referred to as C. sp. 2, C. sp. 3, and C. sp. PS1010. Its genome was sequenced at the California Institute of Technology in 2010. This species is gonochoristic. It has distinct morphology and behavior compared to C. elegans; notably, C. angaria males exhibit a spiral mating behavior. Its divergence from C. elegans is similar to the distance between humans and fish. C. castelli is its closest relative, and the two species can produce F1 hybrids.

C. angaria was isolated in Trinidad and Florida, found in association with palm and sugarcane weevils, Rhynchophorus palmarum and Metamasius hemipterus. Dauer larvae wave and are transported by adult weevils. The association is probably phoretic, although C. angaria can develop on dead weevils.

This species groups with C. castelli in the 'Drosophilae' supergroup in phylogenetic studies.
