= Caenorhabditis tropicalis =

Scientific classification
- Kingdom: Animalia
- Phylum: Nematoda
- Class: Chromadorea
- Order: Rhabditida
- Family: Rhabditidae
- Genus: Caenorhabditis
- Species: C. tropicalis

Binomial name
- Caenorhabditis tropicalis Felix, Braendle & Cutter, 2014

Synonyms
- Caenorhabditis sp. 11

Species of roundworm

Caenorhabditis tropicalis is a species of Caenorhabditis nematodes, belonging to the Elegans super-group and Elegans group within the genus. It is a close relative of C. wallacei. C. tropicalis is collected frequently in tropical South America, Caribbean islands, and various islands in the Indian and Pacific Oceans from rotting fruit, flowers and stems. C. tropicalis was referred to as "C. sp. 11" prior to 2014.

== Anatomy ==
The mean body lengths of adult hermaphroditic and adult male C. tropicalis were calculated as 1378.63 μm and 992.85 μm, respectively, making C. tropicalis males and hermaphrodites on average larger than other hermaphroditic species like C. elegans and C. briggsae.

=== Spicule shape ===
The spicules of C. tropicalis males consist of a long, slender, pointed, and simple morphology, which is a common feature among Caenorhabditis species outside of the Elegans super-group (with the exception of C. japonica and C. afra).

== Reproduction ==
C. tropicalis demonstrates a hermaphroditic mode of reproduction. Similar to C. elegans and C. briggsae, androdioecious populations of C. tropicalis are made up of protandrous hermaphrodites (XX sex chromosome karyotype) and X0 males. These three species are not each other's closest relatives, supporting the independent evolutionary origins of hermaphroditism and androdioecy. The self-fertile hermaphroditic reproductive strategy of these species is an example of convergent evolution.

== Ecology ==
C. tropicalis was first discovered from La Reunion island in the Indian Ocean in 2008, with subsequent collection in Puerto Rico and Cape Verde Islands in the Atlantic Ocean, French Guiana and Brazil in South America, and Hawaii in the Pacific Ocean. C. tropicalis has only been sampled from tropical regions thus far. It is one of the most commonly-sampled Caenorhabditis species in the Nouragues Nature Reserve of French Guiana, where it has been isolated both in litter samples and from rotting fruits and flowers.

Like other Caenorhabditis species found in the tropical rainforest of French Guiana, C. tropicalis is commonly found among rotting flower substrates. This species demonstrates a preferential association with rotting flowers in earlier stages of decay, indicated by a decrease in association with flowers in later stages of decay.

C. tropicalis has shown inter-species associations with Nematocida major, an intracellular pathogen that has also been observed to associate with C. elegans and C. briggsae, two other hermaphroditic Caenorhabditis nematode species. N. major infections of these nematodes have only been observed in tropical regions even though C. elegans is predominantly found in temperate regions.

== Genetics ==
The genome of C. tropicalis reference strain JU1373 consists of around 79.32 million base pairs and 22,326 protein coding genes. These genome characteristics make it shorter than the C. elegans genome, which consists of around 100.29 million base pairs and 20,326 protein coding genes. Like all known Caenorhabditis species, the genome of C. tropicalis is partitioned into six chromosomes (five autosomes and one "X" sex chromosome).

=== Outbreeding Depression ===
Like the other Androdioecious Caenorhabditis species, C. tropicalis demonstrates outbreeding depression mediated by Medea like elements, which can result in lethality in C. tropicalis offspring, which results in smaller population sizes, it is likely due to this why C. tropicalis faces an evolutionary pressure to demonstrate high rates of inbreeding. Crosses between strains of C. tropicalis isolated from different locations resulted in a higher frequency of defective offspring in comparison to crosses between strains of C. tropicalis from the same location. High inbreeding rates in C. tropicalis has subsequently resulted in a significant decrease in genomic diversity in this species compared to other Caenorhabditis nematodes. C. tropicalis, along with C. briggsae and C. elegans, the other two hermaphroditic Caenorhabditis species demonstrate 20-40% smaller genome sizes compared to gonochoristic or male-female Caenorhabditis species.
