= Caenorhabditis yunquensis =

Scientific classification
- Domain: Eukaryota
- Kingdom: Animalia
- Phylum: Nematoda
- Class: Chromadorea
- Order: Rhabditida
- Family: Rhabditidae
- Genus: Caenorhabditis
- Species: C. yunquensis

Binomial name
- Caenorhabditis yunquensis Félix, Marie-Anne; Braendle, Christian; Cutter, Asher D., 2014

Synonyms
- Caenorhabditis sp. 19

Species of roundworm

Caenorhabditis yunquensis is a species of nematodes in the genus Caenorhabditis. Prior to 2014, it was referred to as C. sp. 19. The single isolate of this species is from El Yunque, Puerto Rico.

This species groups with C. nouraguensis in the 'Japonica' group, the sister clade to the 'Elegans' group, in the 'Elegans' supergroup.
