= Nouragues Nature Reserve =

Nature reserve in French Guiana

- IUCN category IV (habitat/species management area)
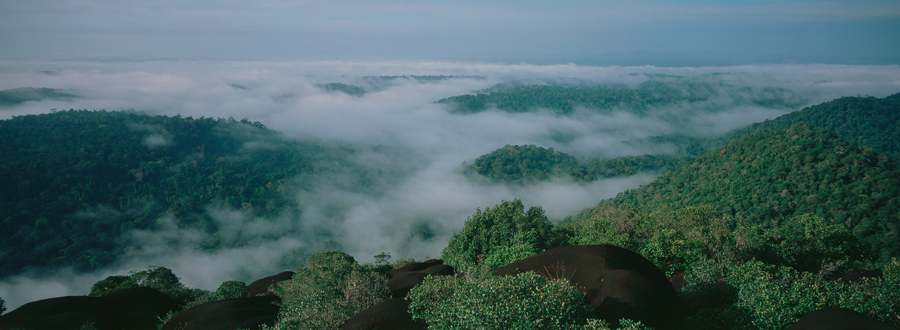

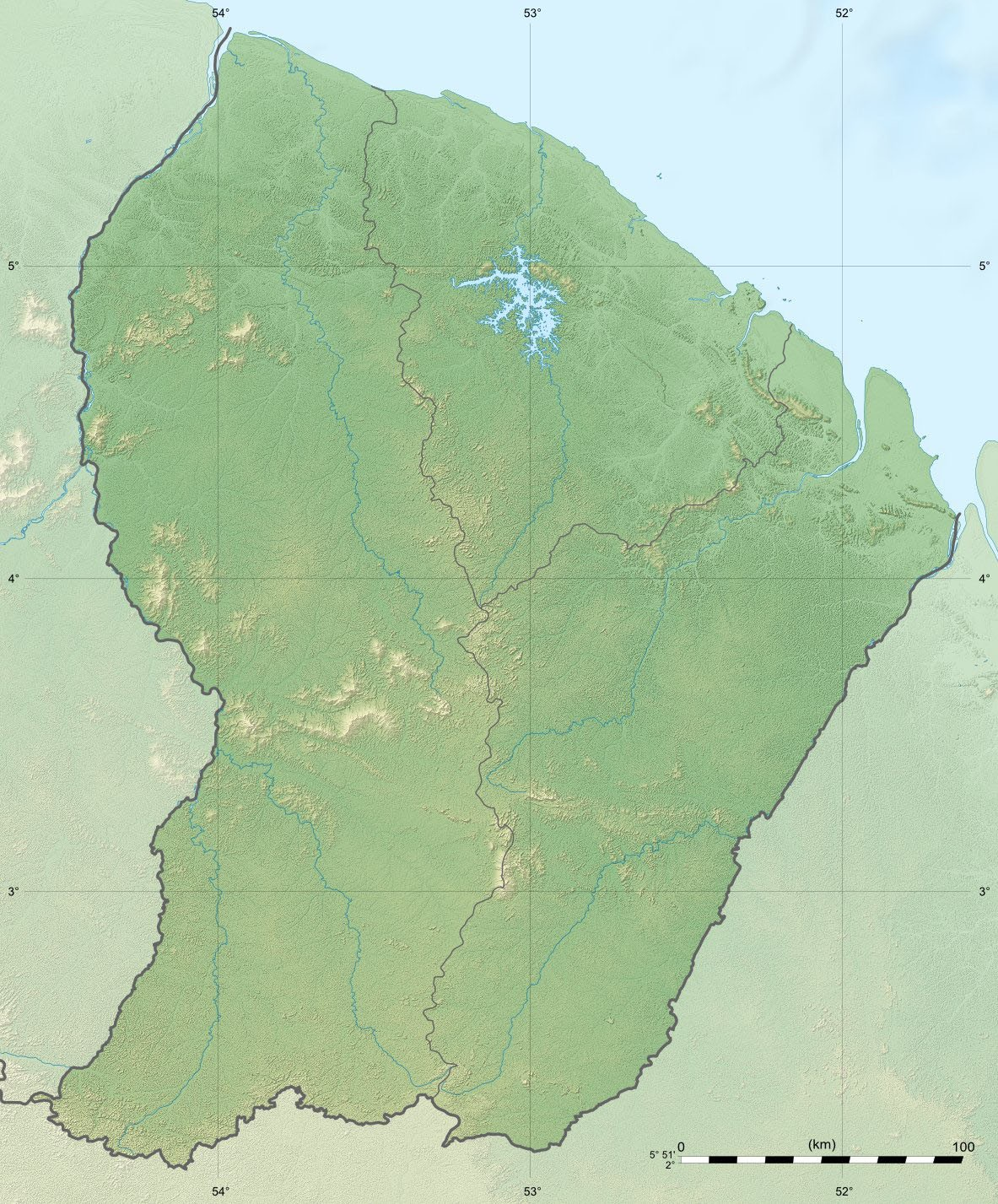
- Location within French Guiana
- Location: French Guiana, France
- Nearest city: Régina
- Coordinates: 4.0855°N 52.6818°W
- Area: 1,000 km^{2} (390 sq mi)
- Established: 18 December 1995
- Governing body: National Forests Office
- Website: Nouragues.fr (in French)

Nouragues Nature Reserve is a French nature reserve in French Guiana created in 1995. It protects 1,000 square kilometres (390 sq mi) of tropical rainforest in the communes of Régina and Roura.

== Overview ==
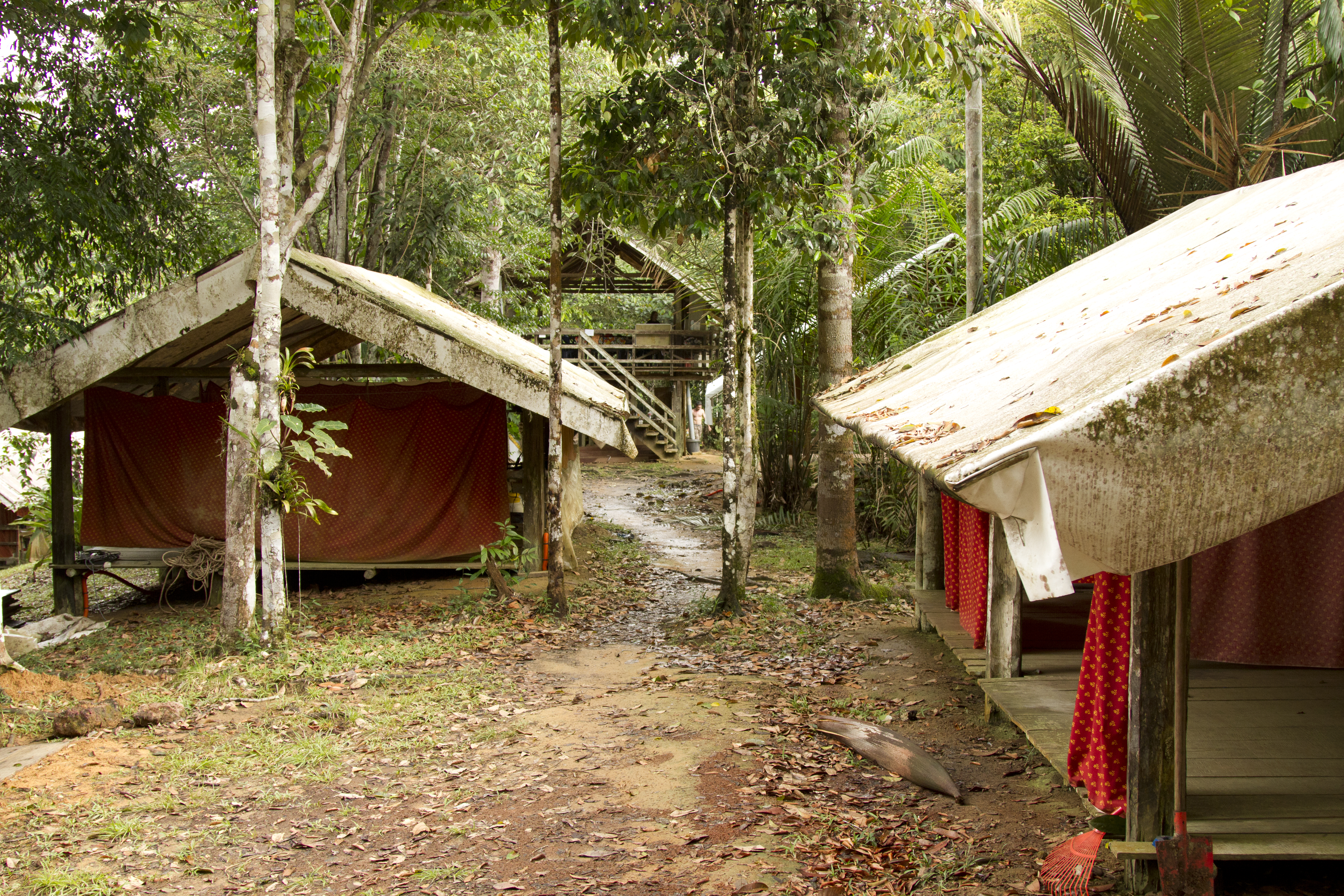
Camp of CNRS on the Nouragues Inselberg.

Nouragues Nature Reserve is the second largest nature reserve of France. The name is of Amerindian origin. The reserve is mainly covered by rainforests and is hilly. The Nouragues Inselberg dominates the region with its height of 430 metres (1,410 ft).

The nature reserve is not accessible to the public except with authorisation.

== Nouragues Station ==
CNRS operates two permanent camps on the Nouragues Inselberg. The camp is home to about 40 expeditions a year and is on a good location to study the rainforest and its biodiversity. The camps can be accessed by helicopter or by boat from Saut Pararé.
