= Victor Nigon =

French biologist (1920–2015)

Victor Marc Nigon (born 11 October 1920 in Metz, France, died 5 July 2015) was a biologist who was first to study the nematode worm Caenorhabditis elegans in the laboratory, with Ellsworth Dougherty, in the 1940s.

Jean-Louis Brun, a student of Nigon, continued experiments on the 'Bergerac' variety of C. elegans.

The specific epithet given to the nematode species Caenorhabditis nigoni is a tribute to Victor Nigon.

== See also ==
- History of research on Caenorhabditis elegans
