= Caenorhabditis castelli =

Scientific classification
- Domain: Eukaryota
- Kingdom: Animalia
- Phylum: Nematoda
- Class: Chromadorea
- Order: Rhabditida
- Family: Rhabditidae
- Genus: Caenorhabditis
- Species: C. castelli

Binomial name
- Caenorhabditis castelli Félix, Marie-Anne; Braendle, Christian; Cutter, Asher D., 2014

Synonyms
- Caenorhabditis sp. 12

Species of roundworm

== Introduction ==
Caenorhabditis castelli is a species of Caenorhabditis nematodes, a member of the same genus as the model organism Caenorhabditis elegans. Within this genus, C. castelli belongs to the Drosophilae super-group, and Angaria group. This species is a close relative of C. angaria and was referred to as "C. sp. 12" prior to 2014. C. castelli was discovered from rotting Micropholis cayennensis fruit in the Nouragues Nature Reserve of tropical French Guiana in 2008. It is one of the rarest species found in French Guiana.

== Anatomy ==
The mean body length of adult female C. castelli was measured to be 1212.24 μm and for adult males, 827.61 μm, which is comparable to the average male body size of the model organism C. elegans (824.74 μm).

=== Spicule shape ===
The spicules of C. castelli males possess a short, stout, evenly curved, complex morphology, similar to other Caenorhabditis species within the Angaria and Drosophila groups.

== Reproduction ==
Like most species of Caenorhabditis, C. castelli demonstrates a gonochoristic, or male-female, mode of reproduction, as opposed to C. elegans and C. briggsae which demonstrate an androdioecious mode of reproduction, such that populations primarily include self-fertile hermaphrodites with more rare males. Notably, C. castelli mates in a spiral mating style, where the male wraps around the female with its posterior end, a characteristic shared with other species in the Angaria group.

C. castelli males contain larger sperm cells (28.81 μm^{2}) on average compared to hermaphroditic Caenorhabditis species like C. elegans (19.55 μm^{2}), C. briggsae (18.65 μm^{2}) and C. tropicalis (19.81 μm^{2}).

=== Hybridization ===
In the lab, C. castelli can hybridize with C. angaria to produce sterile females and slow growing males. Hybridization of C. castelli with C. quiockensis was attempted, but the two species failed to hybridize.
