= Ellsworth Dougherty =

American botanist (1921–1965)

- Born: July 21, 1921
- Died: 1965 (aged 43–44)
- Occupation: Biologist
- Awards: Guggenheim Fellowship

Ellsworth C. Dougherty (July 21, 1921 – 1965) was a biologist who was first to study the nematode worm Caenorhabditis elegans in the laboratory, with Victor Nigon, in the 1940s. He did most of his studies and medical work in California.

== Tributes ==
Mount Dougherty is a mountain range in Antarctica named after Ellsworth Dougherty.

The specific epithet given to the nematode species Caenorhabditis doughertyi is also a tribute to E. Dougherty.

== See also ==
- History of research on Caenorhabditis elegans
