= Rhabditis =

Scientific classification
- Kingdom: Animalia
- Phylum: Nematoda
- Class: Chromadorea
- Order: Rhabditida
- Family: Rhabditidae
- Genus: Rhabditis; Dujardin, 1845

Genus of roundworms

Rhabditis is a genus of nematodes in the family Rhabditidae.

Names brought to synonymy

Rhabditis (Caenorhabditis) Osche, 1952 is a synonym for Caenorhabditis Dougherty, 1955

== Species ==
- Rhabditis aberrans
- Rhabditis marina
- Rhabditis maxima
- Rhabditis necromena
- Rhabditis sylvatica
- Rhabditis terricola
