= Axenic =

Microbiological culture with only a single species or strain of organism

In biology, axenic (/eɪˈzɛnɪk/, /eɪˈzinɪk/) (from Ancient Greek a- (not) + xénos (of a foreigner)) describes the state of a culture in which only a single species, variety, or strain of organism is present and entirely free of all other contaminating organisms. The earliest axenic cultures were of bacteria or unicellular eukaryotes, but axenic cultures of many multicellular organisms are also possible. Axenic culture is an important tool for the study of symbiotic and parasitic organisms in a controlled environment.

== Preparation ==
Axenic cultures of microorganisms are typically prepared by subculture of an existing mixed culture. This may involve use of a dilution series, in which a culture is successively diluted to the point where subsamples of it contain only a few individual organisms, ideally only a single individual (in the case of an asexual species). These subcultures are allowed to grow until the identity of their constituent organisms can be ascertained. Selection of those cultures consisting solely of the desired organism produces the axenic culture. Subculture selection may also involve manually sampling the target organism from an uncontaminated growth front in an otherwise mixed culture, and using this as an inoculum source for the subculture.

Axenic cultures are usually checked routinely to ensure that they remain axenic. One standard approach with microorganisms is to spread a sample of the culture onto an agar plate, and to incubate this for a fixed period of time. The agar should be an enriched medium that will support the growth of common contaminating organisms. Any growth on this plate proves that the culture is no longer axenic, regardless of which contaminant species is present. In contrast, lack of growth cannot prove that the culture non-axenic, so if knowledge of axenic status is essential, other methods have to be used. Any method capable of demonstrating unintended species in the culture can be used. Depending on the type of organism being cultured, this may include other growth media (with different specificities), physical methods such as light or electron microscopy, chemical methods to detect species-specific metabolites, DNA or RNA analysis, and so on.

== Experimental use ==
As axenic cultures are derived from very few organisms, or even a single individual, they are useful because the organisms present within them share a relatively narrow gene pool. In the case of an asexual species derived from a single individual, the resulting culture should consist of identical organisms (though processes such as mutation and horizontal gene transfer may introduce a degree of variability). Consequently, they will generally respond in a more uniform and reproducible fashion, simplifying the interpretation of experiments.

=== Problems ===
The axenic culture of some pathogens is complicated because they normally thrive within host tissues which exhibit properties that are difficult to replicate in vitro. This is especially true in the case of intracellular pathogens. However, careful replication of key features of the host environment can sometimes resolve these difficulties (e.g. host metabolites, dissolved oxygen), such as with the Q fever pathogen, Coxiella burnetii.. When trying to replicate symbiotic and parasitic relationships, the situation is more complex as it may be impossible to grow the desired organism without its host organism, which may be providing very specific physical and chemical functions which cannot be replicated in the laboratory. For example, all orchids have relationships with orchid mycorrhiza (intra-cytoplasmic fungal hyphae), and in many cases neither the orchid nor the fungi can be separately cultivated.

== See also ==
- Asepsis
- Gnotobiotic animal
  - Germ-free animal
- Sterilization (microbiology)
