= Bacterial cellular morphologies =

Shapes characteristic of certain bacteria and archaea

Bacteria display a large diversity of cell morphologies and arrangements.

Bacterial cellular morphologies are the shapes that are characteristic of various types of bacteria and often key to their identification. Their direct examination under a light microscope enables the classification of these bacteria (and archaea).

Generally, the basic morphologies are spheres (coccus) and round-ended cylinders or rod shaped (bacillus). But, there are also other morphologies such as helically twisted cylinders (example Spirochetes), cylinders curved in one plane (selenomonads) and unusual morphologies (the square, flat box-shaped cells of the Archaean genus Haloquadratum). Other arrangements include pairs, tetrads, clusters, chains and palisades.

== Types ==
=== Coccus ===
Arrangement of cocci bacteria

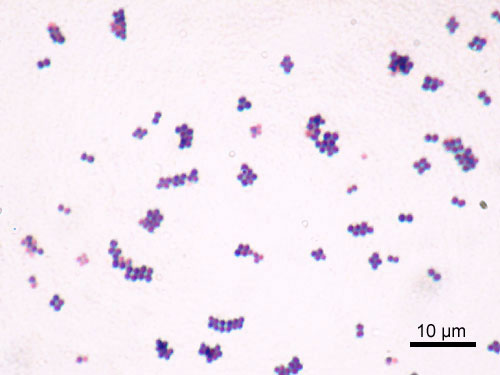
Staphylococcus bacteria

A coccus (plural cocci, from the Latin coccinus (scarlet) and derived from the Greek kokkos (berry)), is any microorganism (usually bacteria) whose overall shape is spherical or nearly spherical. Coccus refers to the shape of the bacteria and can contain multiple genera, such as staphylococci or streptococci. Cocci can grow in pairs, chains, or clusters, depending on their orientation and attachment during cell division. In contrast to many bacilli-shaped bacteria, most cocci bacteria do not have flagella and are non-motile.

Cocci is an English loanword of a modern or Neo-Latin noun, which in turn stems from the Greek masculine noun κόκκος (cóccos) meaning 'berry'.

Important human diseases caused by coccoid bacteria include staphylococcal infections, some types of food poisoning, some urinary tract infections, toxic shock syndrome, gonorrhea, as well as some forms of meningitis, throat infections, pneumonias, and sinusitis.

==== Arrangements ====
Coccoid bacteria often occur in characteristic arrangements and these forms have specific names as well; listed here are the basic forms as well as representative bacterial genera:

- Diplococci are pairs of cocci.
- Streptococci are chains of cocci such as Streptococcus pyogenes.
- Staphylococci are irregular (grape-like) clusters of cocci (e.g. Staphylococcus aureus).
- Tetrads are clusters of four cocci arranged within the same plane such as Micrococcus sp.).
- Sarcina describes a pack-like cuboidal arrangement of eight cocci such as Sarcina ventriculi.

==== Gram-positive cocci ====
The gram-positive cocci are a large group of bacteria with similar morphology. All are spherical or nearly so, but they vary considerably in size. Members of some genera are identifiable by the way cells are attached to one another: in pockets, in chains, or grape-like clusters. These arrangements reflect patterns of cell division and that cells stick together. Sarcina cells, for example, are arranged in cubical pockets because cell division alternates regularly among the three perpendicular planes. Streptococcus spp. resemble a string of beads because division always occurs in the same plane. Some of these strings, for example, S. pneumoniae, are only two cells long. They are called diplococci. Species of Staphylococcus have no regular plane of division. They form grape-like structures.

The various gram-positive cocci differ physiologically and by habitat. Micrococcus spp. are obligate aerobes that inhabit human skin. Staphylococcus spp. also inhabit human skin, but they are facultative anaerobes. They ferment sugars, producing lactic acid as an end product. Many of these species produce carotenoid pigments, which color their colonies yellow or orange. Staphylococcus aureus is a major human pathogen. It can infect almost any tissue in the body, frequently the skin. It often causes nosocomial (hospital-acquired) infections.

==== Diplococci ====
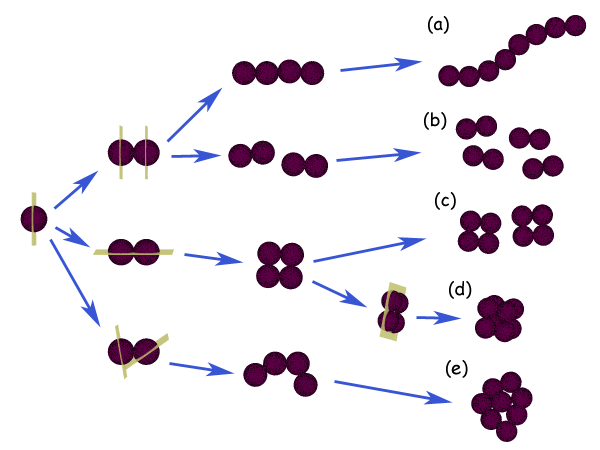
Structure b represents diplococcus bacteria

Diplococci are pairs of cocci. Examples of gram-negative diplococci are Neisseria spp. and Moraxella catarrhalis. Examples of gram-positive diplococci are Streptococcus pneumoniae and Enterococcus spp. Presumably, diplococcus has been implicated in encephalitis lethargica. The genus Neisseria belongs to the family Neisseriaceae. This genus, Neisseria, is divided into more than ten different species, but most of them are gram negative and coccoid. The gram-negative, coccoid species include: Neisseria cinerea, N. gonorrhoeae, N. polysaccharea, N. lactamica, N. meningitidis, N. mucosa, N. oralis and N. subflava. The most common of these species are the pathogenic N. meningitidis and N. gonorrhoeae.

The genus Moraxella belongs to the family Moraxellaceae. This genus, Moraxellaceae, comprises gram-negative coccobacilli bacteria: Moraxella lacunata, M. atlantae, M. boevrei, M. bovis, M. canis, M. caprae, M. caviae, M. cuniculi, M. equi, M. lincolnii, M. nonliquefaciens, M. osloensis, M. ovis, M. saccharolytica, and M. pluranimalium. However, only one has a morphology of diplococcus, M. catarrhalis, a salient pathogen contributing to infections in the human body.

The species Streptococcus pneumoniae belongs to the genus Streptococcus and the family Streptococcaceae. The genus Streptococcus has around 129 species and 23 subspecies that benefit many microbiomes on the human body. There are many species that show non-pathogenic characteristics; however, there are some, like S. pneumoniae, that exhibit pathogenic characteristics in the human body.

The genus Enterococcus belongs to the family Enterococcaceae. This genus is divided into 58 species and two subspecies. These gram-positive, coccoid bacteria were once thought to be harmless to the human body. However, within the last ten years, there has been an influx of nosocomial pathogens originating from Enterococcus bacteria.

=== Bacillus ===
A bacillus (pl.: bacilli), also called a bacilliform bacterium or often just a rod (when the context makes the sense clear), is a rod-shaped bacterium or archaeon. Bacilli are found in many different taxonomic groups of bacteria. However, the name Bacillus, capitalized and italicized, refers to a specific genus of bacteria. The name Bacilli, capitalized but not italicized, can also refer to a less specific taxonomic group of bacteria that includes two orders, one of which contains the genus Bacillus. When the word is formatted with lowercase and not italicized, 'bacillus', it will most likely be referring to shape and not to the genus. Bacilliform bacteria are also often simply called rods when the bacteriologic context is clear.

Bacilli usually divide in the same plane and are solitary, but can combine to form diplobacilli, streptobacilli, and palisades.

- Diplobacilli: Two bacilli arranged side by side with each other.
- Streptobacilli: Bacilli arranged in chains.
- Coccobacillus: Oval and similar to coccus (circular shaped bacterium).

There is no connection between the shape of a bacterium and its color upon Gram staining; there are both gram-positive rods and gram-negative rods. MacConkey agar can be used to distinguish among gram-negative bacilli such as E. coli and salmonella.

==== Arrangements ====
Bacilli usually divide in the same plane and are solitary, but can combine to form diplobacilli, streptobacilli, and palisades.

- Diplobacilli: Two bacilli arranged side by side with each other.
- Streptobacilli: Bacilli arranged in chains.

==== Gram-positive examples ====
- Actinomyces
- Bacillus
- Clostridium
- Corynebacterium
- Listeria
- Propionibacterium

==== Gram-negative examples ====
- Bacteroides
- Citrobacter
- Enterobacter
- Escherichia
- Klebsiella
- Pseudomonas
- Proteus
- Salmonella
- Serratia
- Shigella
- Vibrio
- Yersinia

=== Coccobacillus ===
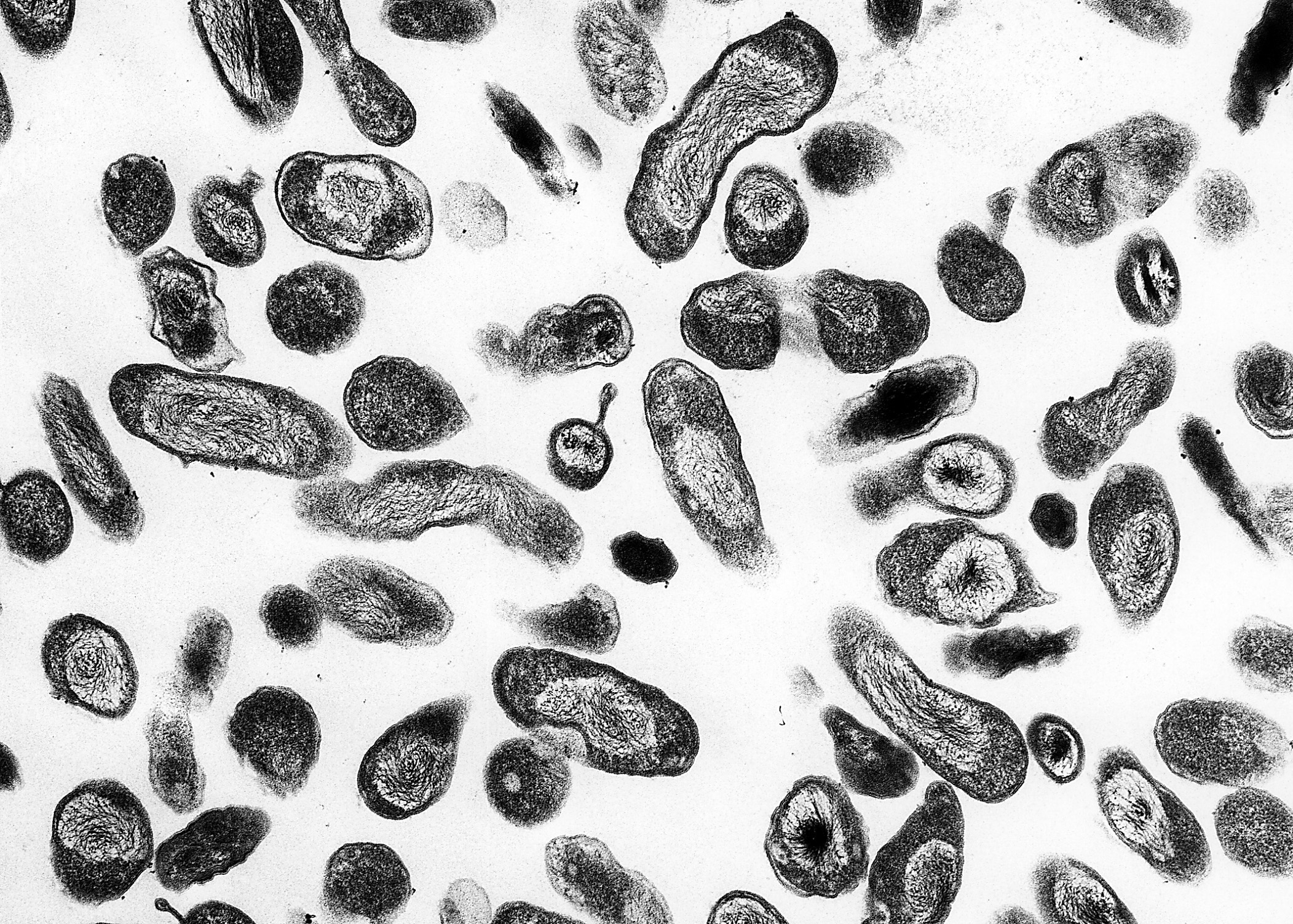
Coxiella burnetii (TEM)

A coccobacillus (plural coccobacilli), or bacillococcus, is a type of bacterium with a shape intermediate between cocci (spherical bacteria) and bacilli (rod-shaped bacteria). Coccobacilli, then, are very short rods which may be mistaken for cocci. The word coccobacillus reflects an intermediate shape between coccus (spherical) and bacillus (elongated).

Haemophilus influenzae, Gardnerella vaginalis, and Chlamydia trachomatis are coccobacilli. Aggregatibacter actinomycetemcomitans is a Gram-negative coccobacillus prevalent in subgingival plaques. Acinetobacter strains may grow on solid media as coccobacilli. Bordetella pertussis is a Gram-negative coccobacillus responsible for causing whooping cough. Yersinia pestis, the bacterium that causes plague, is also a coccobacillus.

Coxiella burnetii is also a coccobacillus. Bacteria from the genus Brucella are medically important coccobacilli that cause brucellosis. Haemophilus ducreyi, another medically important Gram-negative coccobacillus, is observed in sexually transmitted disease, chancroid, of Third World countries.

=== Spiral ===
Spiral bacteria are another major bacterial cell morphology. Spiral bacteria can be sub-classified as spirilla, spirochetes, or vibrios based on the number of twists per cell, cell thickness, cell flexibility, and motility.

Bacteria are known to evolve specific traits to survive in their ideal environment. Bacteria-caused illnesses hinge on the bacteria's physiology and their ability to interact with their environment, including the ability to shapeshift. Researchers discovered a protein that allows the bacterium Vibrio cholerae to morph into a corkscrew shape that likely helps it twist into — and then escape — the protective mucus that lines the inside of the gut.

==== Spirillum ====
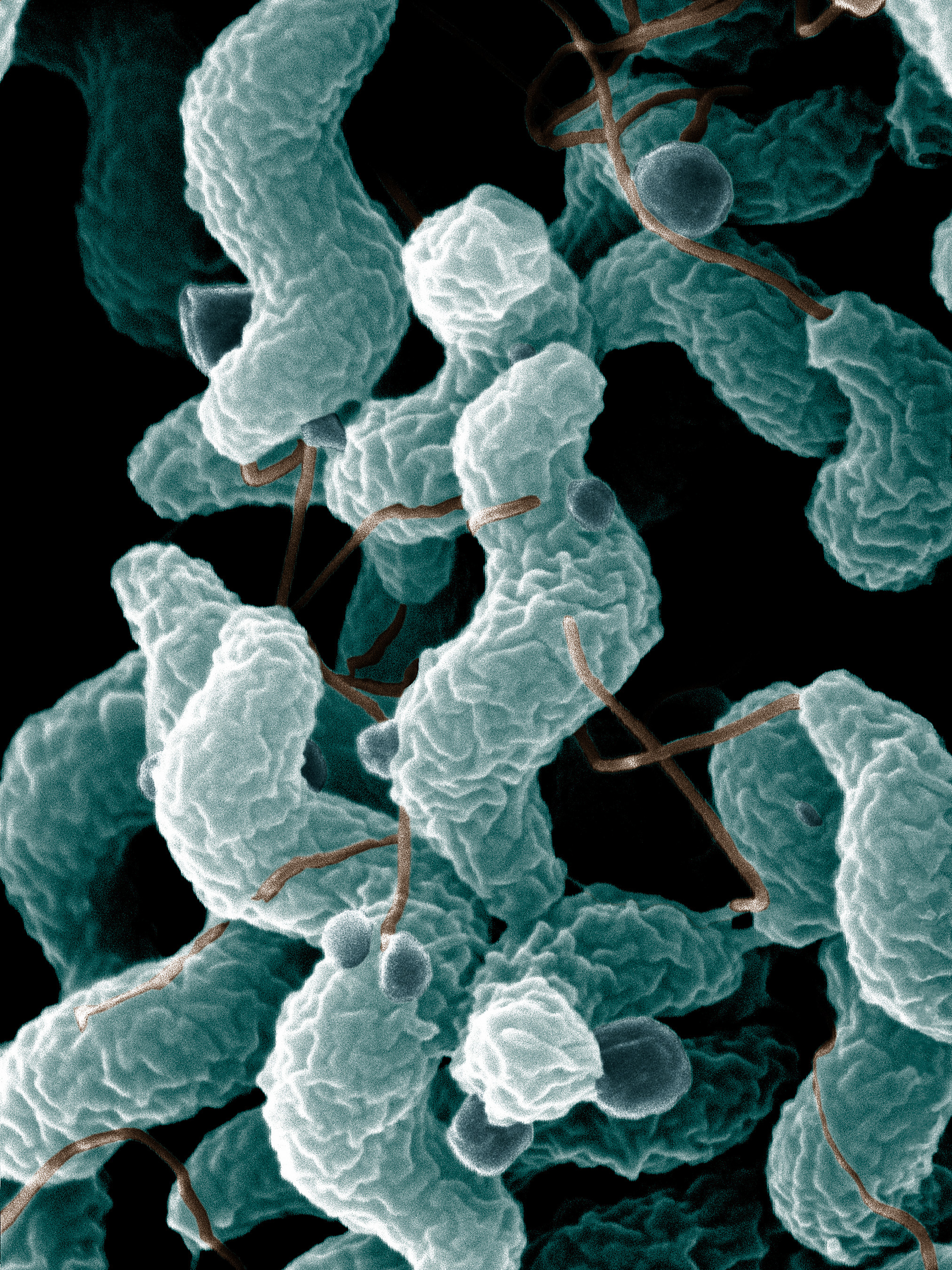
Campylobacter jejuni is a common pathogen of bacterial food-related gastrointestinal illness.

A spirillum (plural spirilla) is a rigid spiral bacterium that is gram-negative and frequently has external amphitrichous or lophotrichous flagella. Examples include:

- Members of the genus Spirillum
- Campylobacter species, such as Campylobacter jejuni, a foodborne pathogen that causes campylobacteriosis
- Helicobacter species, such as Helicobacter pylori, a cause of peptic ulcers

==== Spirochetes ====
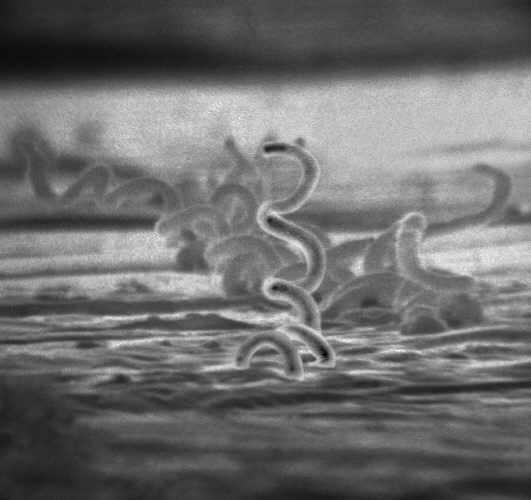
Thin spirochete Treponema pallidum bacteria, the causative agent of syphilis magnified 400 times.

A spirochete (plural spirochetes) is a very thin, elongate, flexible, spiral bacteria that is motile via internal periplasmic flagella inside the outer membrane. They comprise the phylum Spirochaetes. Owing to their morphological properties, spirochetes are difficult to Gram-stain but may be visualized using dark field microscopy or Warthin–Starry stain. Examples include:

- Leptospira species, which cause leptospirosis.
- Borrelia species, such as Borrelia burgdorferi, a tick-borne bacterium that causes Lyme disease
- Treponema species, such as Treponema pallidum, subspecies of which causes treponematoses, including syphilis

=== Helical ===
Helicobacter species are helically shaped, the most common example of which is Helicobacter pylori. A helical shape is seen to be better suited for movement of bacteria in a viscous medium.

== See also ==
- Bacterial morphological plasticity
- Ferdinand Cohn – gave first named shapes of bacteria
