= Axenfeld =

Axenfeld or Aksenfeld may refer to:

- Israel Aksenfeld (a.k.a. Israel Axenfeld / Yisroel Aksenfeld, 1787-1866), a German writer
- Karl Theodor Paul Polykarpus Axenfeld (1867-1930), a German ophthalmologist
- Karl Theodor Georg Axenfeld (1869-1924), a German superintendent of the Kurmark
- Edith Picht-Axenfeld (1914-2001), a German pianist and harpsichordist
- Morax-Axenfeld diplobacilli, a bacterium
- Axenfeld syndrome, a rare autosomal dominant disorder
