= Non-fermenter =

Group of bacteria

Non-fermenters (also non-fermenting bacteria) are a taxonomically heterogeneous group of bacteria of the phylum Pseudomonadota that cannot catabolize glucose, and are thus unable to ferment. This does not necessarily exclude that species can catabolize other sugars or have anaerobiosis like fermenting bacteria.

The coccoid or bacillary bacteria can be found in soil or wet areas. They are non-sporulating bacteria and Gram-negative. Some species are also pathogenic for humans, so their detection (e.g. with analytical profile index 20 NE) has great relevance in the diagnosis of bacterial infections.

== List of non-fermenters ==
- Acinetobacter
- Alcaligenes
- Burkholderia
- Moraxella
- Pseudomonas
- Shewanella
- Stenotrophomonas

Also, pathogenic species include Pseudomonas aeruginosa and Moraxella catarrhalis.
