= Moraxella atlantae =

Scientific classification
- Domain: Bacteria
- Kingdom: Pseudomonadati
- Phylum: Pseudomonadota
- Class: Gammaproteobacteria
- Order: Pseudomonadales
- Family: Moraxellaceae
- Genus: Moraxella
- Species: M. atlantae

Binomial name
- Moraxella atlantae Bøvre et al. 1976

Type strain
- ATCC 29525, CCM 6072, CCUG 6415, CCUG 6415 A, CDC 5118, CIP 82.25, DSM 6999, GIFU 3177, IFO 14588, LMG 5133, LMG 5314NBRC 14588, NCTC 11091

Synonyms
- Moraxella atlantensis

Species of bacterium

Moraxella atlantae is a Gram-negative, oxidase-positive and catalase-positive, rod-shaped, nonmotile bacterium in the genus Moraxella. First described in 1976 it was recognized as a rare opportunistic pathogen in humans starting in 1991.

== Taxonomy and microbiological characteristics ==
Moraxella atlantae was first described as a new species in 1976 based on biochemical and microbiological growth characteristics: It resembled Moraxella phenylpyruvica, but differed in "simultaneous lack of urease and phenylalanine and tryptophan deaminase activities, inability to grow on solid medium at 4 to 10°C, relative salt sensitivity, and different behaviour on bile-containing media." In difference it also contains n-octadecanol and mannose. It is a non-fermenter and has been difficult to identify by biochemical phenotypic characteristics, like API. It was previously known as CDC group M-3. In 2008, the Judicial Commission of the International Committee for Systematics of Prokaryotes ruled that a subgenus name of Moraxella atlantae (subgen. Moraxella Lwoff 1939)) should have been included on the Approved Lists of Bacterial Names, but in 2014 this was rescinded.

== Infections in humans ==
M. atlantae was first recognized as a rare opportunistic pathogen in humans in 1991, when it was isolated from the blood culture of a person with SLE. In a case report from 2002 it was isolated from aerobic blood cultures from a female cancer patient, and could not be identified based on phenotypic characteristics and Analytical profile index, but only after 16S rRNA gene amplification. It was then identified in 2016 and in 2017 in one patient each with pneumonia and bacteremia.

In 2017, it was described as causing keratitis in one case. A 2018 case report from Spain described it in the native aortic valve of a butcher with infective endocarditis without apparent risk factors.

=== Frequency of isolation ===
As of 2002, the University of Gothenburg had collected only 12 M. atlantae strains, 10 of which had been isolated since 1981, of which most were from blood (10), and only one from pleural fluid, and one from a dog bite wound each.

== Treatment of infections ==
M. atlantae can usually be treated by common antibiotics.
