= Oscheius =

Scientific classification
- Kingdom: Animalia
- Phylum: Nematoda
- Class: Chromadorea
- Order: Rhabditida
- Family: Rhabditidae
- Genus: Oscheius; Andrassy, 1976

Species
- Oscheius carolinensis Ye et al., 2010; Oscheius dolichura (Schneider, 1866); Oscheius dolichuroides; Oscheius guentheri, Sudhaus et al., 1994; Oscheius insectivora; Oscheius myriophila; Oscheius onirici Torrini et al., 2015; Oscheius tipulae (Lam and Webster, 1971)

Genus of roundworms

Oscheius is a genus of nematode.

O. tipulae is a satellite developmental genetic model organism used to study vulva formation.

In phylogenetic studies, based on the analysis of sequences of three nuclear genes, Oscheius groups with Caenorhabditis species and the Diploscapter, Protorhabditis and Prodontorhabditis 'Protorhabditis' group, all included in the 'Eurhabditis' group of Rhabditidae genera.
