= Moraxella bovoculi =

Scientific classification
- Domain: Bacteria
- Kingdom: Pseudomonadati
- Phylum: Pseudomonadota
- Class: Gammaproteobacteria
- Order: Pseudomonadales
- Family: Moraxellaceae
- Genus: Moraxella
- Species: M. bovoculi

Binomial name
- Moraxella bovoculi Angelos et al. 2007

Type strain
- ATCC BAA-1259, CCUG 52049, CIP 109558, strain 237

Species of bacterium

Moraxella bovoculi is a Gram-negative bacterium in the genus Moraxella, which was isolated from the eyes of calves in Browns Valley, California. M. bovoculi can cause infectious bovine keratoconjunctivitis.
