= Osche =

Osche may refer to:

- The former name for the town of Osie now in Poland
- Günther Osche (1926–2009), a German evolutionary biologist

== See also ==
- Osches
