= Moraxella osloensis =

Scientific classification
- Domain: Bacteria
- Kingdom: Pseudomonadati
- Phylum: Pseudomonadota
- Class: Gammaproteobacteria
- Order: Pseudomonadales
- Family: Moraxellaceae
- Genus: Moraxella
- Species: M. osloensis

Binomial name
- Moraxella osloensis Bøvre and Henriksen 1967 (Approved Lists 1980)

Species of bacterium

Moraxella osloensis is a Gram-negative oxidase-positive, aerobic bacterium within the family Moraxellaceae in the gamma subdivision of the purple bacteria.

Moraxella osloensis is a mutualistic symbiont of the slug-parasitic nematode Phasmarhabditis hermaphrodita. In nature, Phasmarhabditis hermaphrodita vectors M. osloensis into the shell cavity of the slug host in which the bacteria multiply and kill the slug.

== Lifecycle ==
This bacterium has been identified as one of the natural symbionts of a bacteria-feeding nematode, Phasmarhabditis hermaphrodita (Rhabditida: Rhabditidae), which is an endoparasite of slugs, including the slug Deroceras reticulatum (grey garden slug) which is one of the most serious agricultural and garden slug pests.

In nature, bacteria colonize the gut of nematode-infective juveniles which represent a specialized stage of development adapted for survival in the unfavorable environment. The infective juveniles seek out and enter the slug's shell cavity through the posterior mantle region. Once inside the shell cavity, the bacteria are released, and the infective juveniles resume growth, feeding on the multiplying bacteria. The infected slugs die in 4–10 days, and the nematodes colonize the entire carcass and produce next-generation infective juveniles, which leave the carcass to seek a new host. The bacteria are responsible for killing the slugs; nematodes without bacteria do not cause death.

== Biochemistry ==
The lipopolysaccharide, that is an endotoxin, from M. osloensis is a molluscicide for Deroceras reticulatum when applied by injection.

The lethality of these nematodes to slugs has been shown to correlate with the number of M. osloensis cells carried by infective juveniles. Tan and Grewal (2001) demonstrated that the 72-hour-old M. osloensis cultures inoculated into the shell cavity were highly pathogenic to the slug. They further reported that M. osloensis produced an endotoxin which was identified to be a rough type lipopolysaccharide with a molecular weight of 5300 KD, and the purified lipopolysaccharide was toxic to the slug with an estimated 50% lethal dose of 48 μg when injected into the shell cavity.

== Infections of humans ==
Although M. osloensis rarely infects humans, it can sometimes be found in a variety of tissues, where it sometimes causes disease. Antibiotics are usually effective against such infections.

== Odor ==
Moraxella osloensis has been found to be responsible for locker-room smell or shower-curtain odor.

== Classification ==
The species M. osloensis was proposed in 1967; the bacteria which are now considered to be M. osloensis would previously have been considered to be Moraxella nonliquefaciens or Mima polymorpha (var.) oxidans.

== See also ==
- List of restriction enzyme cutting sites
