= Hans-Jürgen Stammer =

Hans-Jürgen Stammer (born 21 September 1899 in Pötrau near Büchen; died 24 October 1968 in Erlangen) was a German zoologist, ecologist and director of the Zoological Institute of the University Erlangen.

== Biography ==
Stammer was a student of Paul Buchner (1886–1978), the director of the zoological institute of the University Greifswald. Stammer fellowed Buchner to the University Breslau, where he began doing research in the field of ecology. Here he was habilitated in 1931. 1938 Stammer became the director of the Zoological Institute of the University Erlangen. There he was very active in teaching and researching and supervised diploma theses or phd-theses of about 200 students. Stammer was retired in 1967.

== Research ==
As an ecologist and zoologist he was interested in unusual and small habitats, which were only poorly studied or completely unknown concerning their biodiversity. In such micro-habitats, he often discovered nematodes and mites as well as some other organisms. He supervised students, who studied these organisms in detail. That way, his students became specialists for designated animal groups. They formed the so-called "Stammer-School".

Besides free living and non-parasitic organisms, Stammer also made research in the field of parasitology. The evolutionary biologist Günther Osche started his career with a nematode-research (genus Rhabditis) having Stammer as his scientific supervisor.

Stammer was honored with several species, which were named after him, for example: Nitocrella stammeri Chappuis, 1938; Zausodes stammeri Jakobi, 1954; Lohmanella stammeri Viets, 1939 or Histiostoma stammeri Scheucher, 1957.

== Literature ==
- G. Alberti (2004): Tribute to the past – notes on the history of Acarology in Germany. Phytophaga, XIV: 13-56.
- Matthes D., Osche G., Tretzel E. (1969): Hans Jürgen Stammer †. Verh. Zool. Ges. 1969, Zool. Anz., Suppl., 33: 656-657.
- R. Scheucher (1957): Systematik und Ökologie der deutschen Anoetinen. Beiträge zur Systematik und Ökologie mitteleuropäischer Acarina, 1, S. 233-384.
