= Mesorhabditis acidophila =

Scientific classification
- Domain: Eukaryota
- Kingdom: Animalia
- Phylum: Nematoda
- Class: Chromadorea
- Order: Rhabditida
- Family: Rhabditidae
- Genus: Mesorhabditis
- Species: M. acidophila

Binomial name
- Mesorhabditis acidophila Borgonie, Dierick, Houthoofd, Willems, Jacobs & Bert, 2010

Species of roundworm

Mesorhabditis acidophila is a species of nematode that has been discovered by Borgonie et al. in 2010. This nematode has the exceptional capacity to survive in extreme acidic conditions. The most prominent reason for the adaptation of this species to such an environment is to escape predators.

== Habitat ==
=== Acidic environment ===
This species was first found in a cave called Cueva de Villa Luz in Tabasco, Mexico. The cave was filled with approximately 32 subterranean springs that rise from the floor; some of them contain a high concentration of hydrogen sulfide (H_{2}S). H_{2}S is a highly acidic gas that lowers the acidity or pH of the water in the springs. When H_{2}S and oxygen are absorbed by the water on the cave wall, sulfuric acid in high concentration is formed due to oxidation.

'Snottites', white hollow mucous tubes, hang from the ceiling. The water dripping off these snottites has a pH between 0 and 3 and it is in these snottites (in a high acidic environment) that M. acidophila can be found.

=== Predators ===
M. acidophila has adapted to this extreme environment to fend off predators. Outside the snottites there are a lot of mites that most likely prey on the nematodes. These nematodes provide a high nutritional value to the mites, especially carbon. Consequently, the nematodes have adapted to a more acidic area inside the snottites so that the mites have more difficulty accessing to the nematodes. This way the nematodes have a better chance of survival.

== Characteristics ==
=== Morphometric data ===
All the measurements are provided in micrometers (μm).

=== Differential diagnosis ===
There are three distinct characteristics that differentiate M. acidophila from all other species of Mesorhabditis:

- the presence of an overhanging anterior anal lip
- the preanal position of the phasmid
- the relatively long female tail

== Phylogenetic analysis ==
M. acidophila is part of a clade that contains M. longespiculosa, M. ansisomorpha and two as yet unidentified species of Mesorhabditis (grey box). A phylogenetic tree shows more detailed information about the phylogeny of this species.
