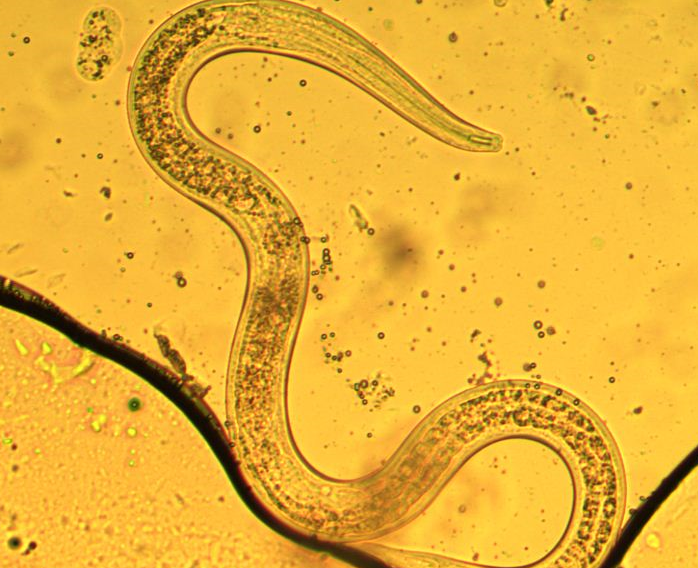
- Third stage dauer larva P. hermaphrodita

Scientific classification
- Kingdom: Animalia
- Phylum: Nematoda
- Class: Chromadorea
- Order: Rhabditida
- Family: Rhabditidae
- Genus: Phasmarhabditis
- Species: P. hermaphrodita

Binomial name
- Phasmarhabditis hermaphrodita (A. Schneider, 1859)

= Phasmarhabditis hermaphrodita =

Species of roundworm

Phasmarhabditis hermaphrodita is a facultative parasitic nematode that can kill slugs and snails. It belongs to the family Rhabditidae, the same family as Caenorhabditis elegans.

P. hermaphrodita is a bacterial-feeding nematode and is a lethal parasite of several terrestrial gastropod families such as Arionidae, Milacidae and Limacidae. It is also able to reproduce on rotting matter or penetrate and remain in resistant slug and snail species where it awaits for their death and will then reproduce on the cadaver (necromeny). P. hermaphrodita was first isolated and documented by A. Schneider in 1859 and was intensively studied in the 1990s by researchers at Long Ashton Research centre who were focused on finding a new biocontrol agent for slugs. P. hermaphrodita was isolated here and developed as a biological control agent (Nemaslug®) for minimising agriculture damage from slugs and snails in 1994.

== Anatomy ==
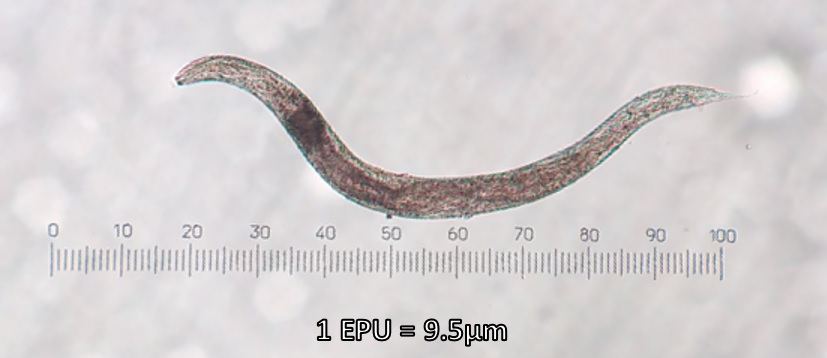
10x magnification photo of Adult Hermaphroditic Female nematode (Phasmarhabditis hermaphrodita). 1 Eye Piece Unit = 9.5μm

P. hermaphrodita is unsegmented, vermiform, bilateral symmetrical pseudocoelomate. The body dimensions and structure of P. hermaphrodita is comparable to C. elegans' with a body length 1.3 - 1.7mm long and an estimated circumference of 0.180mm. The primary structures are the Rhabditida-specific mouth, the pharynx, the intestine, the reproductive system (uterus, spermatheca, gonads) and the cuticle. Like all nematodes, it has four muscle bands that span the length of the body and has no devoted respiratory or circulatory system. P. hermaphrodita has four larval stages before becoming a fully reproductive hermaphroditic adult female. Males do exist in this species, but are very rare with Maupas only able to find 21 males among 15,000 individuals (0.14% of the population). Third-stage dauer larvae are produced in unfavourable conditions such as low food levels, high population density or high temperatures. Dauer larvae have constricted pharynx, double the thickness of a normal cuticle and increase of lipid droplets in their cytoplasm. However, the most important aspect of the dauer stage is its ability to serve as the infective stage that seeks out new hosts, once the previous bacterial food source has been depleted. Dauers do not require a food source and can survive up to eight times longer than the original life span of a non-dauer nematode. P. hermaphrodita is morphologically identical to two other Phasmarhabditis species P. neopapillosa and P. tawfiki. However, P. neopapillosa is a gonochoristic species with an equal number of males and females.

== Biological control of slugs ==
Terrestrial gastropods are a common problem in agricultural areas with a moist climate around the world, crop damage occurs via the eating of leaves and stems and/or contaminating them with slime and faeces. In the UK alone, slugs affect 59% of total area for rapeseed oil crops and 22% of wheat crops. Without any type slug control for both rapeseed oil and wheat crops, the cost to the UK agricultural industry would be an approximate £43.5 million per year.

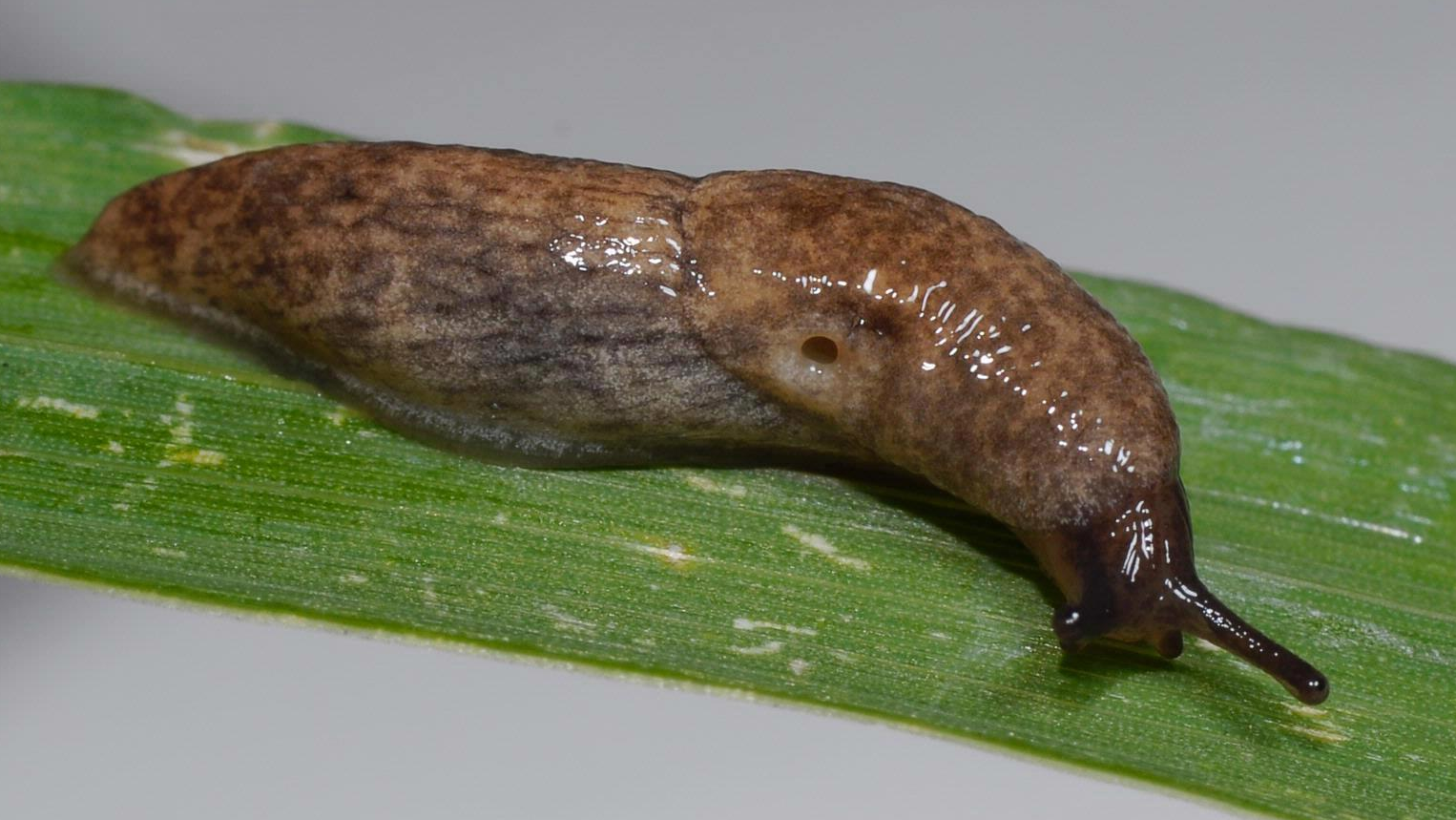
Slug pest Deroceras reticulatum is a common agricultural and horticultural pest and is one of the host species affected by Phasmarhabditis hermaphrodita

P. hermaphrodita was developed into a natural molluscicide to prevent crop damage from horticultural slug pests from the families Agriolimacidae, Arionidae, Limacidae, Milacidae and Vaginulidae. P. hermaphrodita is the only nematode of the eight families (Agfidae, Alloionematidae, Angiostomatidae, Angiostrongylidae, Cosmocercidae, Diplogasteridae, Mermithidae and Rhabditidae) associated with molluscs, which has been developed as a biological molluscicide, first released under the name Nemaslug® by MicroBio Ltd in 1994, then acquired by Becker Underwood in 2000 and finally taken over by BASF in 2012. Nemaslug® is sold in 15 European countries and is widely used by farmers and gardeners.P. hermaphrodita is currently mass produced in fermenters (up to 20,000 litres (4,400 imperial gallons; 5,300 US gallons)) in a monoxenic liquid broth of the bacterium Moraxella osloensis. In the fields, P. hermaphrodita is applied at 3×10^{9} nematodes /ha (1.2×10^{9}/acre). Nemaslug® has been found to be successful at reducing agricultural damage from slug in crops such as Winter wheat, lettuce, rapeseed, strawberries, Brussels sprouts, asparagus and others. Even though Nemaslug® takes longer (1–3 weeks) to kill slugs than chemical molluscicides, it has been shown to be equally or more effective at killing slugs. An added advantage to P. hermaphrodita is its ability to strongly suppress feeding of infected slugs and to deter non-infected slugs away from treated soil.

== Reproduction and development ==
Phasmarhabditis hermaphrodita is protandrous autogamous hermaphrodite, whose main substrate to reproduce on is mainly bacterial rich environments such as decomposing cadavers (slugs, snails, worms, insects), leaves, compost and slug faeces. Third stage infective dauers seek out new hosts responding to host cues such as slime and faeces or a bacteria rich environment. Once a new host is found, the dauer enters the slug via the dorsal integumental pouch beneath the mantle and then to the shell cavity via the short canal, next the dauer then develops into a self-fertilizing hermaphrodite and starts to produce young. The mother can produce up to 250–300 young whilst inside their still alive host.

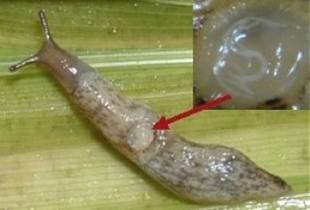
Deroceras reticulatum infected with slug parasitic roundworm Phasmarhabditis hermaphrodita.

At this stage, depending on temperature, the weight of the gastropod, and nematode density in the soil, the host may die within 4 to 21 days, however, studies show if large enough (over 1g), some slugs (e.g. Arion lusitanicus) can resist infection. The process involved in killing the host is still not fully understood, whether it is due to internal damage from new offspring or the releasing of M. osloensis. M. osloensis was found growing cultures of P. hermaphrodita and was shown to kill slugs when injected in large amounts into D. reticulatum, but it is not vertically transmitted to offspring, hence its role in the pathogenicity process is currently unclear. When infected by P. hermaphrodita both morphological and behavioural characteristics of the slug change. Morphological changes include a swelling of the mantle area, where both fluid and reproducing nematodes accumulate. Behavioral changes include the fact that infected slugs will be more attracted to areas with populations of P. hermaphrodita, increasing the reproductive fitness of the nematode.

Infected slugs will also find secluded places to die, such as cracks in the soil where they can move down into and conceal themselves deeper within the soil layer. This is theorised to be P. hermaphrodita manipulating the host to go to a more favourable environment. This ensures that they are left alone with the cadaver and avoid any interference with scavengers. The soil also helps to prevent the cadaver from drying out, which creates a moist environment that promotes diverse bacterial growth. Reproduction occurs and the next generation continues to reproduce until food runs out and more third stage infective dauers are produced and the cycle is repeated.

== Images ==
Adult Female Phasmarhabditis hermaphrodita crawling into slug flesh
