= Protorhabditis =

Scientific classification
- Domain: Eukaryota
- Kingdom: Animalia
- Phylum: Nematoda
- Class: Chromadorea
- Order: Rhabditida
- Family: Rhabditidae
- Genus: Protorhabditis; Osche, 1952(Osche in Dougherty, 1955)

Species
- Protorhabditis anthobia; Protorhabditis minuta; Protorhabditis tristis; Protorhabditis xylocola

Genus of roundworms

Protorhabditis is a genus of nematodes in the family Rhabditidae.

== Phylogenetic studies ==
The analysis of sequences of three nuclear genes shows that the Protorhabditis, Diploscapter and Prodontorhabditis genera group together to form the 'Protorhabditis' group, the sister group of the Caenorhabditis species, all included in the 'Eurhabditis' group of Rhabditidae genera.
