= IBK =

IBK may refer to:

- Hwaseong IBK Altos, a women's professional volleyball club in South Korea
- ÍBK (Íþróttabandalag Keflavíkur), an Icelandic sports club now known as Keflavík ÍF
- Ibk algorithm, implements the k-nearest neighbor algorithm
- Ibrahim Boubacar Keïta (1945–2022), former president and prime minister of Mali
- Industrial Bank of Korea, a bank headquartered in Seoul, South Korea
- Infectious bovine keratoconjunctivitis, an infection of cattle caused by a rod shaped bacterium
- Innsbruck Airport, an airport in Tyrol in western Austria
- Innsbruck, city in Tyrol in western Austria, Abbreviation commonly used in slang speech and social media
