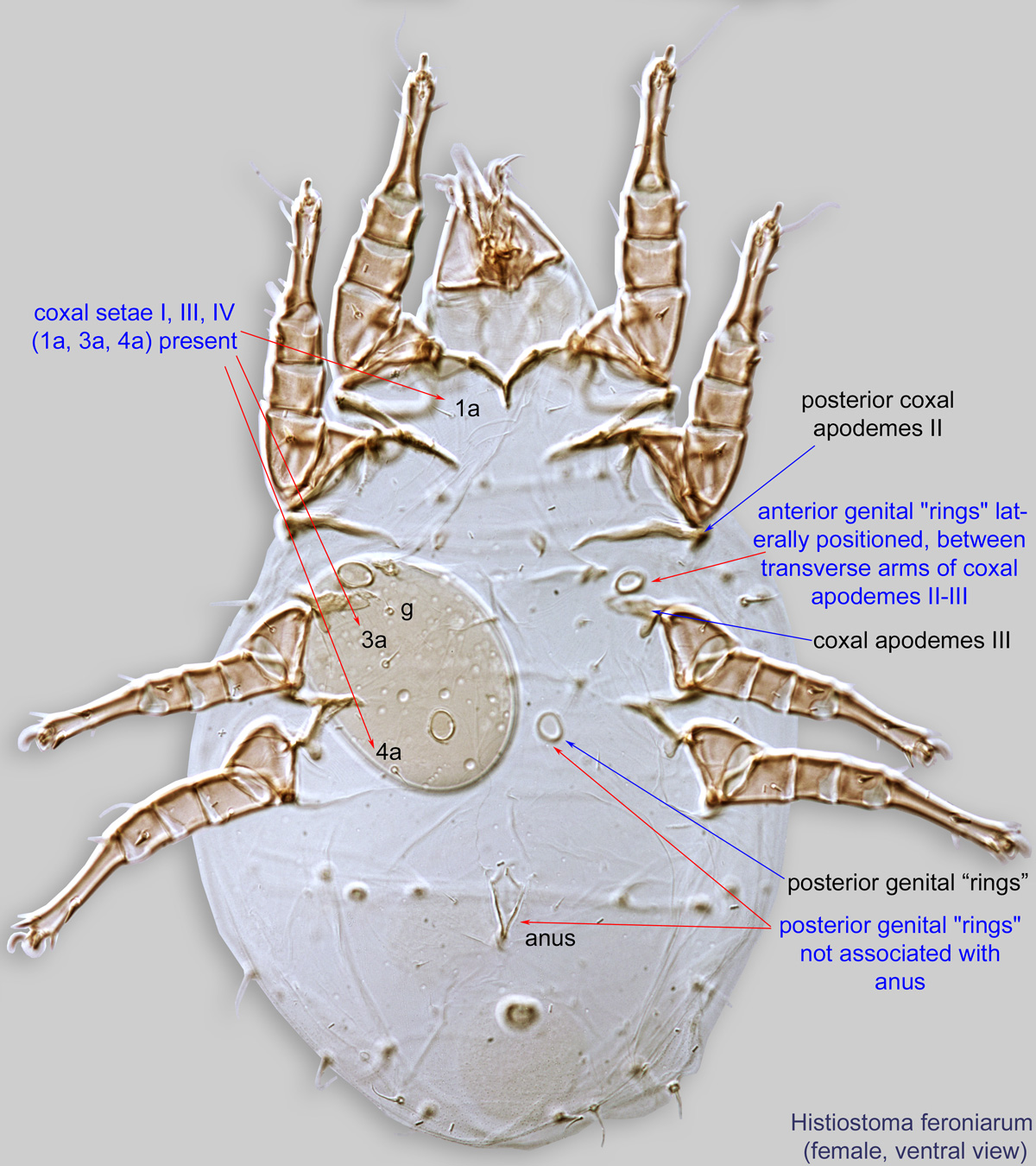
- Ventral surface of Histiostoma feroniarum

Scientific classification
- Domain: Eukaryota
- Kingdom: Animalia
- Phylum: Arthropoda
- Subphylum: Chelicerata
- Class: Arachnida
- Order: Sarcoptiformes
- Family: Histiostomatidae
- Genus: Histiostoma; Kramer, 1876

= Histiostoma =

Genus of mites

Histiostoma is a genus of mites in the family Histiostomatidae.

== Description ==
Both females and males of Histiostoma have two pairs of genital rings. In females, the anterior pair are positioned laterally between the bases of the second and third leg pairs, while the posterior pair are not associated with the anus. Additionally, in both sexes the pretarsi have ambulacra that are not bilobed. The chelicerae are modified and brush-like.

Like some other astigmatan mites, Histiostoma can form deutonymphs. Deutonymphs have simple empodial claws. The tarsi of the third and fourth leg pairs have a weak, flexible region in the middle. The pretarsi of these leg pairs have empodial claws. The hysterosomal setae c1, d1 and e1 are all filiform. On the ventral surface is an attachment organ which is wider than long.

== Ecology ==
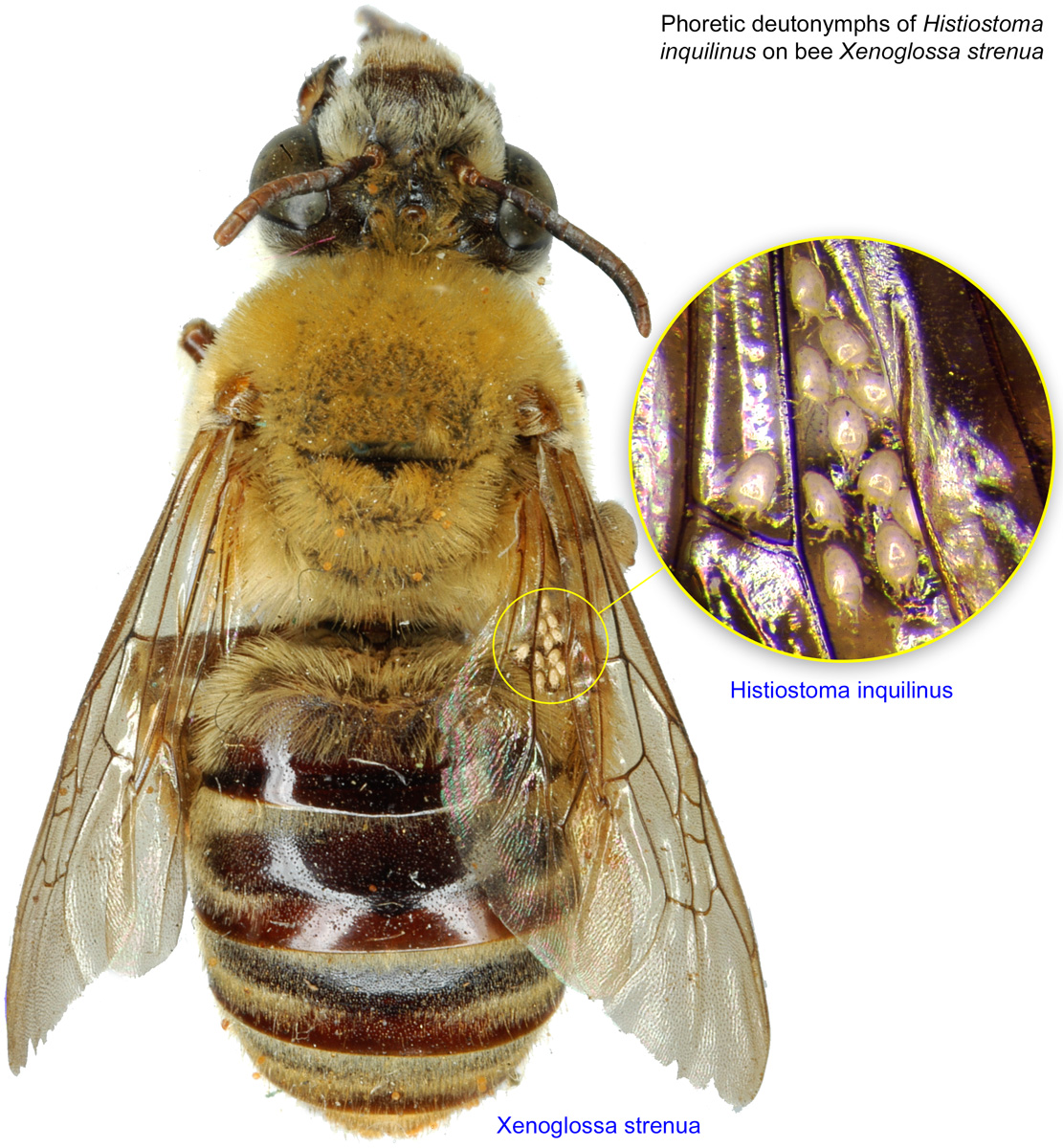
Histiostoma inquilinus on a bee

Histiostoma primarily feed on microbes, which they filter from the substrate using their chelicerae.

Various Histiostoma have deutonymphs associated with insects: H. blomquisti with queens of red imported fire ant, H. polypori with the earwig Forficula auricularia, and various species (e.g. H. ovalis) with bark beetles or bees.

- Both H. polypori and another species, H. maritimum, exhibit necromeny. In the case of H. polypori, it attaches to adult female earwigs while in its deutonymph stage. When a female earwig produces offspring, most of them die before reaching adulthood. Histiostoma polypori moves onto the cadaver of an earwig nymph, where it feeds on bacteria and develops.
- Histiostoma ovalis is phoretic on the bark beetle Ips sexdentatus, meaning it temporarily attaches to this beetle for transport. It feeds on bacteria in wood mould in galleries of its bark beetle host. It also congregates on and around dead beetles. In rare cases, H. ovalis shows hyperphoresis: attaching to another mite species (Dendrolaelaps quadrisetus) that is itself phoretically attached to the bark beetle.
- Histiostoma inquilinus, one of the bee-associated species, can be found in the acarinarium of Xenoglossa bees. They may benefit the bees by protecting them from microbes, which would make this a case of mutualism.

Histiostoma murchiei and H. berghi are instead parasites of annelid cocoons. The former targets earthworms while the latter targets leeches.

Some members of this genus are aquatic. Species of Histiostoma have been found in water, in debris at the bottom of aquaria, on the gills of eels (H. anguillarum), in the swim bladder of iridescent shark (H. piscium) and on the fins and gills of Murray cod (H. papillata). These may be cases of parasitism.

== Reproduction ==
During mating, the male gets on top of the female, facing in the same direction, and clasps her with his legs.

Males in some Histiostoma species have two distinct forms, with some males being larger and with thicker legs than others. This may be for fighting other males for access to females.

Histiostoma murchiei has an unusual method of reproduction. On reaching adulthood, a female lays 2-9 eggs parthenogenetically, which only produce male offspring. The males develop rapidly to adulthood and mate with their mother 3-4 days after laying. Now fertilised, the female lays up to 500 eggs and these produce female offspring.

== Pest status ==
Histiostoma laboratorium is a pest of Drosophila melanogaster cultures, even being named for its prevalence in genetics laboratories. It reproduces faster than D. melanogaster and rapidly overruns cultures.

== Evolution ==
Putative deutonymphs of Histiostoma have been found on a Phloeosinus bark beetle in Baltic amber, meaning this genus' association with bark beetles has existed for at least 44–49 million years.
