= Moraxella =

Scientific classification
- Domain: Bacteria
- Kingdom: Pseudomonadati
- Phylum: Pseudomonadota
- Class: Gammaproteobacteria
- Order: Pseudomonadales
- Family: Moraxellaceae
- Genus: Moraxella; Lwoff, 1939

Type species
- Moraxella lacunata

Species
- M. atlantae M. boevrei M. bovis M. bovoculi M. canis M. caprae M. catarrhalis M. caviae M. cuniculi M. equi M. haemolytica M. lacunata M. lincolnii M. nasibovis M. nasicaprae M. nasovis M. nonliquefaciens M. oblonga M. oculi M. osloensis M. pluranimalium M. porci M. saccharolytica

Genus of bacteria

Moraxella is a genus of gram-negative bacteria in the family Moraxellaceae. It is named after the Swiss ophthalmologist Victor Morax. The organisms are short rods, coccobacilli, or as in the case of Moraxella catarrhalis, diplococci in morphology, with asaccharolytic, oxidase-positive, and catalase-positive properties. M. catarrhalis is the clinically most important species under this genus.

== Roles in disease ==
The organisms are commensals of mucosal surfaces and sometimes give rise to opportunistic infection.

- M. catarrhalis usually resides in respiratory tract, but can gain access to the lower respiratory tract in patients with chronic chest disease or compromised host defenses, thus causing tracheobronchitis and pneumonia. For example, it causes a significant proportion of lower respiratory tract infections in elderly patients with COPD and chronic bronchitis. It is also one of the notable causes of otitis media and sinusitis. It causes similar symptoms to Haemophilus influenzae, although it is much less virulent. Unlike Neisseria meningitidis, which is a morphological relative of M. catarrhalis, it hardly ever causes bacteremia or meningitis.
- Moraxella lacunata is one of the causes of blepharoconjunctivitis in human.
- Moraxella bovis is the cause of infectious bovine keratoconjunctivitis, known colloquially in the United Kingdom as New Forest eye. As a strict aerobe, M. bovis is confined to the cornea and conjunctiva, resulting in a progressive, nonself-limiting keratitis, ulceration, and – ultimately – rupture of the cornea. The disease is relatively common, infecting cattle only. Treatment is the use of either subconjunctival injection of a tetracycline, or topical application of cloxacillin, the former being more effective. The bacterium can be transmitted by flies, so fly control may be necessary on farms throughout the summer. Rupture of the eye is more serious, and requires immediate enucleation, though the procedure itself carries a good prognosis.
