= Mesorhabditis =

Scientific classification
- Domain: Eukaryota
- Kingdom: Animalia
- Phylum: Nematoda
- Class: Chromadorea
- Order: Rhabditida
- Family: Rhabditidae
- Genus: Mesorhabditis; Osche, 1952

Species
- Mesorhabditis acris; Mesorhabditis ansisomorpha; Mesorhabditis acidophila; Mesorhabditis belari; Mesorhabditis irregularis; Mesorhabditis longespiculosa; Mesorhabditis minuta; Mesorhabditis oschei; Mesorhabditis spiculigera

Synonyms
- Bursilla Andrássy, 1976

Genus of roundworms

Mesorhabditis is a genus of nematodes.

Species in the genus Mesorhabditis exhibit an unusual form of parthenogenesis, in which sperm-producing males copulate with females, but the sperm do not fuse with the ovum. Contact with the sperm is essential for the ovum to begin dividing, but because there is no fusion of the cells, the male contributes no genetic material to the offspring, which are essentially clones of the female.
