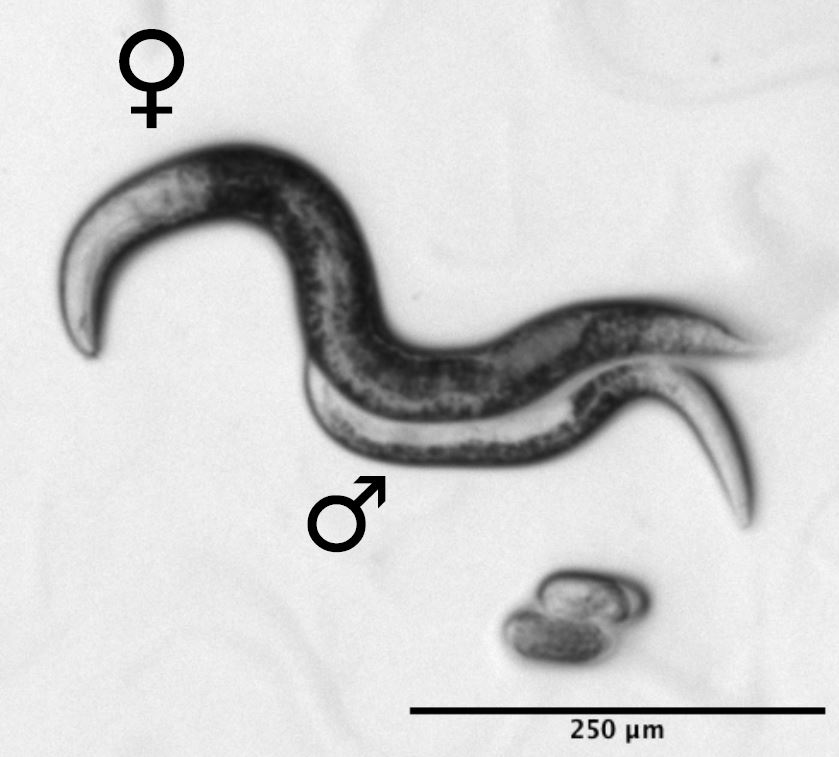
- Copulation

Scientific classification
- Domain: Eukaryota
- Kingdom: Animalia
- Phylum: Nematoda
- Class: Chromadorea
- Order: Rhabditida
- Family: Rhabditidae
- Genus: Mesorhabditis
- Species: M. belari

Binomial name
- Mesorhabditis belari (Nigon, 1949) Dougherty, 1953

Synonyms
- Rhabditis belari Nigon, 1949; Rhabditis (Mesorhabditis) belari Nigon, 1949; Rhabditis filiformis apud Cobb, 1893; Rhabditis monhystera apud Cobb, 1893

= Mesorhabditis belari =

Species of worm

Mesorhabditis belari is a species of nematode in the family Rhabditidae. A non‑parasitic species, it produces a small number of males which are required for reproduction but do not contribute their DNA to the next generation (called pseudogamy or gynogenesis). It also has been observed engaging in programmed DNA elimination (PDE) at the level of individual somatic cells, perhaps as a defense against selfish genetic elements.
