= Moraxella oblonga =

Scientific classification
- Domain: Bacteria
- Kingdom: Pseudomonadati
- Phylum: Pseudomonadota
- Class: Gammaproteobacteria
- Order: Pseudomonadales
- Family: Moraxellaceae
- Genus: Moraxella
- Species: M. oblonga

Binomial name
- Moraxella oblonga Xie and Yokota 2005

Type strain
- ATCC 29468, DSM 17235, IAM 14971, ICPB 3652, JCM 21442, NBRC 102422

Species of bacterium

Moraxella oblonga is a catalase- and oxidase-positive, Gram-negative bacterium in the genus Moraxella, which was isolated from the oral cavity of a sheep. Alysiella sp. was transferred to M. oblonga.
