= Moraxella porci =

Scientific classification
- Domain: Bacteria
- Kingdom: Pseudomonadati
- Phylum: Pseudomonadota
- Class: Gammaproteobacteria
- Order: Pseudomonadales
- Family: Moraxellaceae
- Genus: Moraxella
- Species: M. porci

Binomial name
- Moraxella porci Vela et al. 2010

Type strain
- CCUG 54912, CECT 7294, CIP 110214, SN9-4M

Species of bacterium

Moraxella porci is a Gram-negative, aerobic, catalase- and oxidase-positive, non-endospore-forming bacterium in the genus Moraxella, which was originally isolated from the brain of a pig suffering from meningitis.
