= Phasmarhabditis californica =

Scientific classification
- Domain: Eukaryota
- Kingdom: Animalia
- Phylum: Nematoda
- Class: Chromadorea
- Order: Rhabditida
- Family: Rhabditidae
- Genus: Phasmarhabditis
- Species: P. californica

Binomial name
- Phasmarhabditis californica Tandingan De Ley et al 2016

Species of roundworm

Phasmarhabditis californica is a nematode in the family Rhabditidae. It is a lethal facultative parasite of terrestrial gastropods (slugs and snails).

== Distribution ==
First found in invasive slugs in the USA by Tandingan De Ley et al 2016, also known from New Zealand. Carnaghi et al 2017 finds P. california in Ireland, parasitising a slug endemic to Atlantic Europe, Geomalacus maculosus.
