= Oscheius tipulae =

Scientific classification
- Domain: Eukaryota
- Kingdom: Animalia
- Phylum: Nematoda
- Class: Chromadorea
- Order: Rhabditida
- Family: Rhabditidae
- Genus: Oscheius
- Species: O. tipulae

Binomial name
- Oscheius tipulae (Lam and Webster, 1971)

Synonyms
- Rhabditis (Rhabditella) tipulae Lam and Webster, 1971

Species of roundworm

Oscheius tipulae is a species of nematodes, described in association of the leatherjacket, the larva of Tipula paludosa.

O. tipulae is a satellite developmental genetic model organism used to study vulva formation. It is an androdioecious species characterized by the coexistence of males and hermaphrodites.
