= Phasmarhabditis =

Phasmarhabditis californica

Scientific classification
- Kingdom: Animalia
- Phylum: Nematoda
- Class: Chromadorea
- Order: Rhabditida
- Family: Rhabditidae
- Genus: Phasmarhabditis

Genus of roundworms

Phasmarhabditis (Greek: Phasma = (φάσμα (phantom); rhabditis = (ῥάβδος (rod-like)) is a genus of bacterial-feeding nematodes which are facultative parasites whose primary hosts are terrestrial gastropods (slugs and snails). The name comes from Greek: Phasma- (φάσμα (phantom); rhabditis = rod-like (ῥάβδος (rhabdos). The genus is made up of 18 species (as of 2023) including P. hermaphrodita, P. californica, P. neopapillosa, P. papillosa, P. apuliae, P. bohemica, P. bonaquaense, P. huizhouensis, P. nidrosiensis, P. valida and P. tawfiki.
