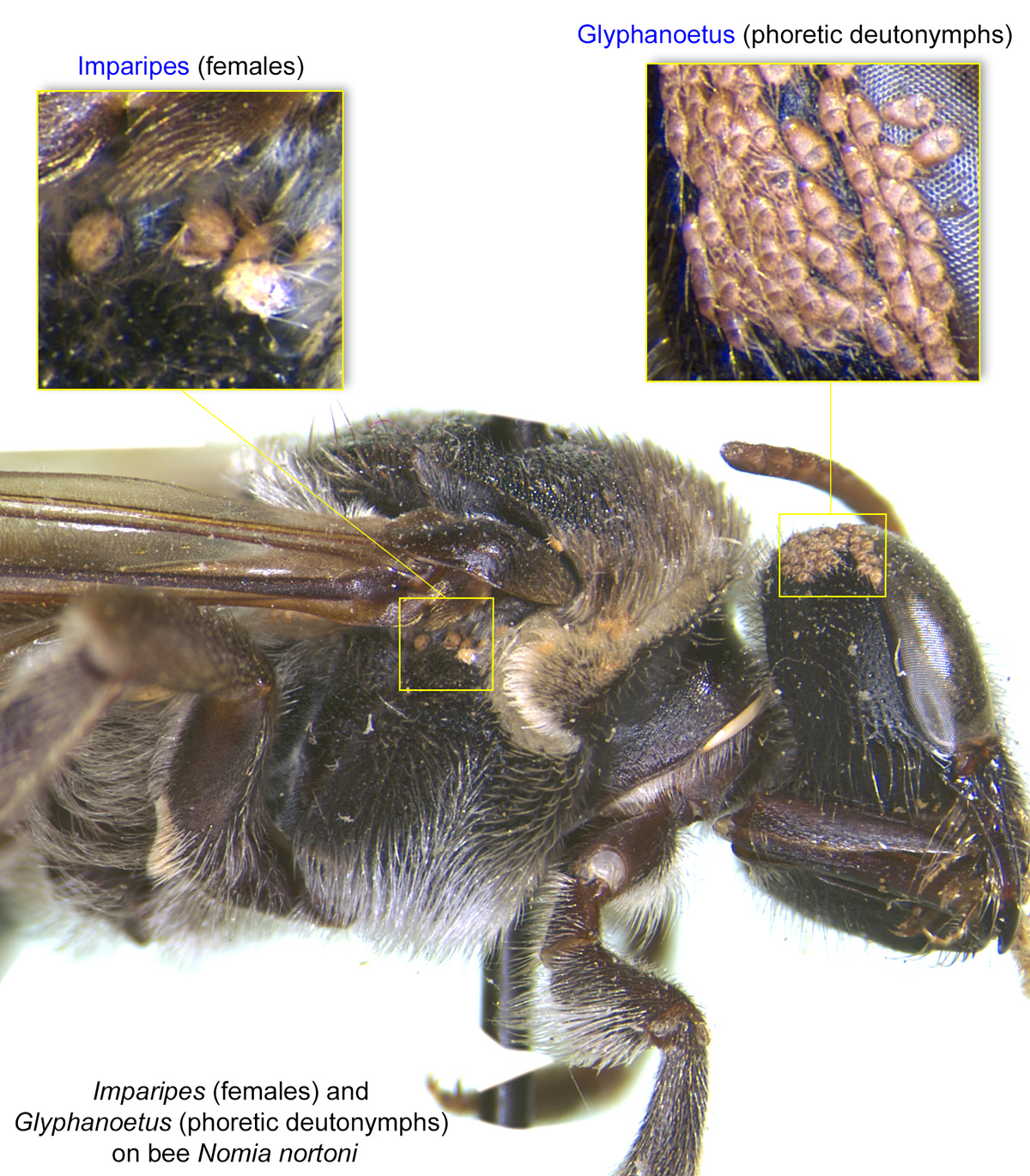

Scientific classification
- Kingdom: Animalia
- Phylum: Arthropoda
- Subphylum: Chelicerata
- Class: Arachnida
- Order: Sarcoptiformes
- Family: Histiostomatidae
- Genus: Glyphanoetus; Oudemans, 1929

= Glyphanoetus =

Genus of mites

Glyphanoetus is a genus of astigs in the family Histiostomatidae.
