= Diploscapter =

Scientific classification
- Kingdom: Animalia
- Phylum: Nematoda
- Class: Chromadorea
- Order: Rhabditida
- Family: Rhabditidae
- Genus: Diploscapter; Cobb, 1913

Species
- Diploscapter bicornis; Diploscapter coronata (Cobb, 1893) syn. Rhabditis coronata Cobb, 1893 - type; Diploscapter lycostoma; Diploscapter pachys

Genus of roundworms

Diploscapter is a genus of nematodes in the family Rhabditidae.

== Phylogenetic studies ==
The genus Diploscapter groups with the genera Protorhabditis and Prodontorhabditis to form the 'Protorhabditis' group, the sister group of the Caenorhabditis species, all included in the 'Eurhabditis' group of Rhabditidae genera.
