= Pelodera =

Scientific classification
- Domain: Eukaryota
- Kingdom: Animalia
- Phylum: Nematoda
- Class: Chromadorea
- Order: Rhabditida
- Family: Rhabditidae
- Genus: Pelodera; Schneider, 1866

Genus of roundworms

Pelodera is a genus of nematodes belonging to the family Rhabditidae.

The species of this genus are found in Europe and Africa.

Species:

- Pelodera aligarhensis Tahseen, Akram, Mustaqim & Ahlawat, 2014
- Pelodera chitwoodi (Bassen, 1940)
- Pelodera conica
- Pelodera kolbi
- Pelodera litoralis (Skwarra, 1921) Dougherty, 1955
- Pelodera operosa Andrássy, 1962
- Pelodera par Andrássy, 1962
- Pelodera punctata (Cobb, 1914) Dougherty, 1955
- Pelodera scrofulata Tahseen, Akram, Mustaqim & Ahlawat, 2014
- Pelodera serrata (Körner, 1952) Dougherty, 1955
- Pelodera strongyloides (Schneider, 1860)
- Pelodera teres Schneider, 1866
- Pelodera voelki
