= Poikilolaimus =

Scientific classification
- Domain: Eukaryota
- Kingdom: Animalia
- Phylum: Nematoda
- Class: Chromadorea
- Order: Rhabditida
- Family: Rhabditidae
- Genus: Poikilolaimus; Fuchs, 1930

Genus of roundworms

Poikilolaimus is a genus of nematodes belonging to the family Rhabditidae.

The species of this genus are found in Europe, America.

Species:

- Poikilolaimus ernstmayri Sudhaus & Koch, 2004
- Poikilolaimus micoletzkyi
- Poikilolaimus piniperdae Fuchs, 1930
- Poikilolaimus regenfussi
