= Necromeny =

Symbiotic relationship in biology

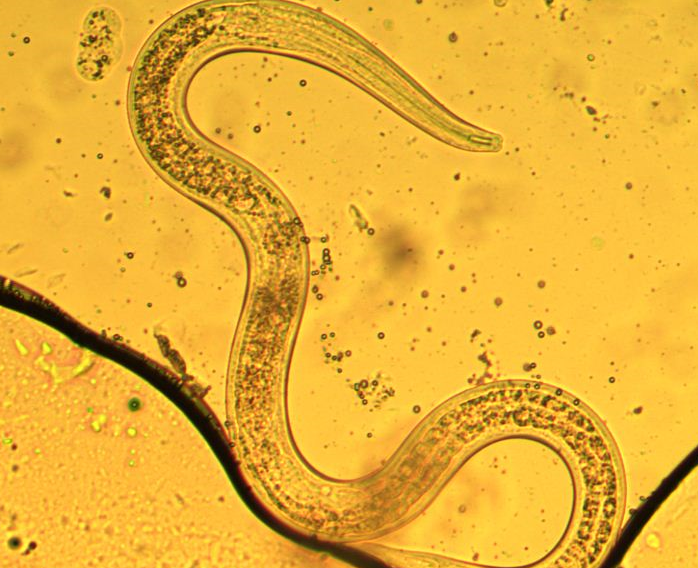
Phasmarhabditis hermaphrodita, a nematode that sometimes engages in necromeny

Necromeny is a symbiotic relationship where an animal (typically a juvenile stage nematode) infects a host and waits inside its body until its death, at which point it develops and completes its life-cycle on the cadaver, feeding on the decaying matter and the subsequent bacterial growth. As the necromenic animal benefits from the relationship while the host is unharmed, it is an example of commensalism.

An example of this is the facultative parasitic nematode species, Phasmarhabditis hermaphrodita. It can kill certain types of slugs and snails (Arionidae, Milacidae and Limacidae), but for more resistant species, it lies dormant until the host dies naturally. Conversely, entomopathogenic nematodes (or EPNs) such as Steinernema and Heterorhabditis also thrive on the decaying corpses of their hosts, but they seek out to actively kill their hosts through the release of a symbiotic bacterium (Xenorhabdus/Photorhabdus and Paenibacillus, respectively).

Necromeny has also been observed in mites, including species of Histiostoma and Sancassania.
