= Theodor Axenfeld =

German ophthalmologist (1867–1930)

Karl Theodor Paul Polykarpus Axenfeld (24 June 1867 – 29 July 1930) was a German ophthalmologist born in Smyrna (İzmir) in the Ottoman Empire to a German minister, who was a Jewish convert to Christianity and served as missionary in Asia Minor. As a child his family moved back to Germany, settling in the town of Godesberg.

He received his medical doctorate in 1890 from the University of Marburg. In 1896 he became an assistant to Wilhelm Uhthoff (1853–1927) at Breslau, and during the following year, was appointed director of the university eye clinic in Rostock. In 1901 he attained the chair of ophthalmology in Freiburg, where he remained until his death in 1930. In 1925 he was chosen as president of the German Ophthalmological Society (Deutsche ophthalmologische Gesellschaft).

== Publications and research ==
Axenfeld was involved in all aspects of ophthalmology and is associated with almost 200 written works involving the eye, including an important textbook of ophthalmology titled Lehrbuch und Atlas der Augenheilkunde (1909). The seventh edition of the textbook was translated into several languages, including English. He published numerous articles on glaucoma, retinal disorders, trachoma and other eye maladies. Axenfeld was particularly interested in bacterial infections of the eye.

In 1909 he was awarded the Graefe Medal by the German Ophthalmological Society for his research of sympathetic ophthalmia. With Otto von Schjerning (1853-1921), he collaborated on the Handbuch der ärztlichen Erfahrungen im Weltkriege. He also made significant contributions to Kolle and Wassermann's Handbuch der pathogenen Mikroorganismen.

== Eponyms ==
Axenfeld has several eponymous ophthalmic terms named after him, including:

- "Axenfeld's conjunctivitis": Conjunctivitis caused by Moraxella lacunata. Sometimes called "Morax' disease": named after Victor Morax (1866-1935), who described the disorder independent of Axenfeld.
- "Axenfeld's nerve loop": A posterior ciliary nerve loop that is noticeable in the sclera.
- "Axenfeld syndrome": A syndrome characterized by corneal embryotoxon (posterior arcuate ring), a distinct Schwalbe's line and iris adhesion to Schwalbe's line.
