= Moraxella saccharolytica =

Scientific classification
- Domain: Bacteria
- Kingdom: Pseudomonadati
- Phylum: Pseudomonadota
- Class: Gammaproteobacteria
- Order: Pseudomonadales
- Family: Moraxellaceae
- Genus: Moraxella
- Species: M. saccharolytica

Binomial name
- Moraxella saccharolytica Flamm 1956

Type strain
- ATCC 19248, CIP 57.36, CIP 68.37, Courtieu 57.08.504, Flamm 1157-55, Lautrop A196, LMG 1039, NCTC 10753

Species of bacterium

Moraxella saccharolytica is a Gram-negative bacterium in the genus Moraxella, which was isolated from the spinal cord of a child with meningitis.
