= Phasmarhabditis neopapillosa =

Scientific classification
- Kingdom: Animalia
- Phylum: Nematoda
- Class: Chromadorea
- Order: Rhabditida
- Family: Rhabditidae
- Genus: Phasmarhabditis
- Species: P. neopapillosa

Binomial name
- Phasmarhabditis neopapillosa (Mengert, 1952)

Species of roundworm

Phasmarhabditis neopapillosa is a nematode in the family Rhabditidae. It is a lethal facultative parasite of the terrestrial gastropods (slugs and snails).
