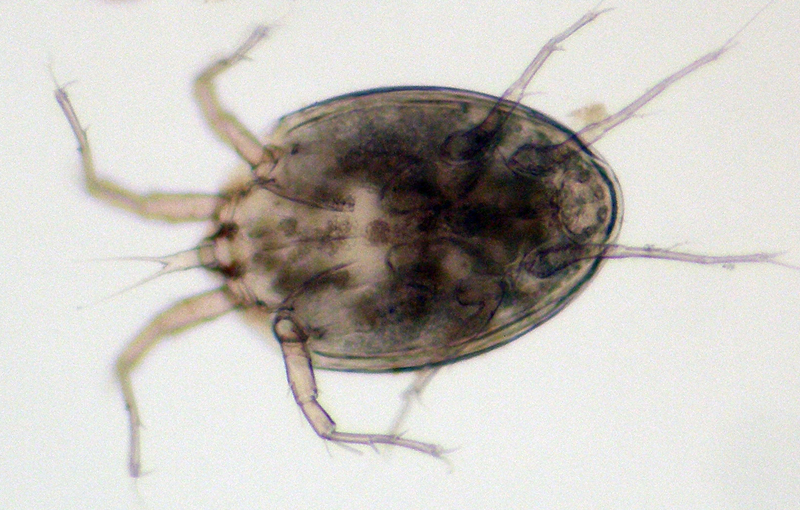
- Ventral view of Sarraceniopus gibsoni, the pitcher plant mite, which is found within the pitcher leaves of Sarracenia purpurea

Scientific classification
- Kingdom: Animalia
- Phylum: Arthropoda
- Subphylum: Chelicerata
- Class: Arachnida
- Order: Sarcoptiformes
- Superfamily: Histiostomatoidea
- Family: Histiostomatidae; Berlese, 1897

= Histiostomatidae =

Histiostomatidae Temporal range: Palaeogene–present

Family of mites

Histiostomatidae is a family of mites in the clade Astigmata.

== Description ==
These mites are characterized by a very small size (about 600–900 μm in length) and a close association to arthropods, mainly insects. A morphologically specialized instar, the deutonymph (earlier "hypopus"), is adapted to attach to arthropods for phoretic transport from one habitat to another. The mites use various insect groups as phoretic carriers such as beetles, flies and Hymenoptera (ants, bees and wasps). In all species, the digitus mobilis of the chelicera is reduced to small rests, and the distal pedipalp article is connected to a more or less complex membranous structure. These mouthpart modifications form an organ to feed on bacteria.

Habitats colonized by these mites include animal dung, compost, water-filled tree hollows and the fluids of Nepenthes and Sarracenia pitcher plants.

== Genera ==
The family contains the following genera:

- Ameranoetus G. S. Ide & S. Mahunka, 1978
- Amyzanoetus Fain, 1976
- Ancyranoetus Fain & J. A. Santiago-Blay, 1993
- Anoetoglyphus Vitzthum, 1927
- Anoetus Dujardin, 1842
- Aphodanoetus M. G. H. Bongers, B. M. OConnor & F. S. Lukoschus, 1985
- Auricanoetus Fain & Zumpt, 1974
- Austranoetus Fain, 1976
- Bonomoia
- Bothyanoetus Fain & A. M. Camerik, 1978
- Capronomoia Mahunka, 1976
- Cederhjelmia Oudemans, 1931
- Ceylanoetus Mahunka, 1974
- Chiloanoetus Fain, 1974
- Chiropteranoetus Womersley, 1942
- Conglanoetus S. Mahunka, 1978
- Copronomoia Mahunka, 1976
- Creutzeria Oudemans, 1932
- Curculanoetus Fain, 1974
- Fibulanoetus Mahunka, 1973
- Ghanoetus Mahunka, 1973
- Glyphanoetus Oudemans, 1929
- Histiostoma Kramer, 1876
- Hormosianoetus Fain, 1980
- Hymenanoetus Mahunka, 1963
- Insulanoetus Sevastyanov, 1973
- Kaszabanoetus Mahunka, 1976
- Loxanoetus Fain, 1970
- Momorangia Southcott, 1972
- Munduytia Oudemans, 1929
- Myianoetus Oudemans, 1929
- Nepenthacarus Fashing, 2002
- Otanoetus Fain & Zumpt, 1974
- Ovanoetus Fain & J. L. van Goethem, 1985
- Peripatetes Mahunka, 1976
- Porrhanoetus Mahunka, 1963
- Probonomoia Fain & G. Rack, 1987
- Prowichmannia Radford, 1950
- Psyllanoetus Fain & Beaucournu, 1974
- Pteranoetus S. Mahunka, 1978
- Rhaphidothrix Mahunka, 1967
- Rhopalanoetus Scheucher in Stammer, 1957
- Richardanoetus K. Samsinak, 1989
- Sarraceniopus N. J. Fashing & B. M. OConnor, 1984
- Scheucheria Mahunka, 1969
- Scolianoetus Fain, 1974
- Scutanoetus Mahunka, 1969
- Seliea Oudemans, 1929
- Semianoetus Mahunka, 1976
- Spinanoetus Scheucher in Stammer, 1957
- Stercoranoetus S. Mahunka & L. Mahunka-Papp, 1991
- Synanoetus Mahunka, 1972
- Syringanoetus Fain, 1980
- Teinokyra Mahunka, 1973
- Traskorchestianoetus Fain & M. J. Colloff, 1990
- Xenanoetus Mahunka, 1969
- Zwickia Oudemans, 1924
