= Dendrolaelaps quadrisetus =

Scientific classification
- Domain: Eukaryota
- Kingdom: Animalia
- Phylum: Arthropoda
- Subphylum: Chelicerata
- Class: Arachnida
- Order: Mesostigmata
- Family: Digamasellidae
- Genus: Dendrolaelaps
- Species: D. quadrisetus

Binomial name
- Dendrolaelaps quadrisetus (A.Berlese, 1920)

Species of mite

Dendrolaelaps quadrisetus is a species of mite in the family Digamasellidae. It is found in Europe.
