= Victor Morax =

Swiss ophthalmologist (1866-1935)

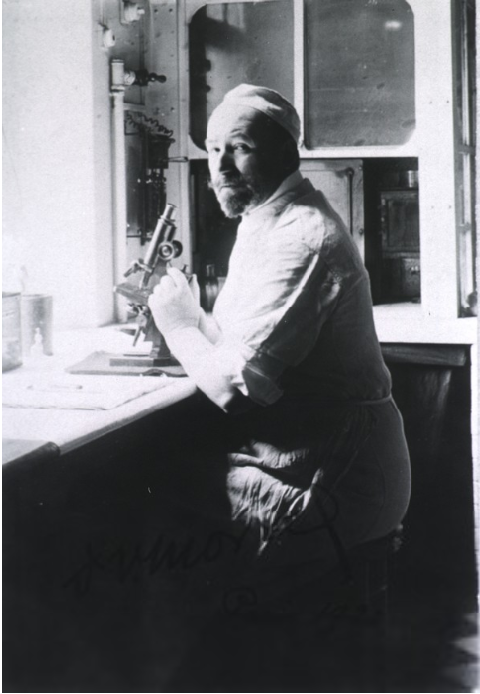
- Victor Morax, Paris, 1920
- Born: Victor Morax; 16 March 1866; Morges, Switzerland
- Died: 14 May 1935 (aged 69); Paris, France
- Occupations: Ophthalmologist; Physician

Victor Morax (16 March 1866 – 14 May 1935) was an ophthalmologist born in Morges, Switzerland.

He studied in Freiburg (Germany) and Paris, and from 1891 to 1903, he worked at the Pasteur Institute in Paris. From 1903 to 1928, he was associated with the Hôpital Lariboisière, rejoining the Pasteur Institute as a permanent member in 1929. In 1930, he became a member of the Académie de Médecine.

While at the Pasteur Institute, Morax discovered the bacillus Moraxella lacunata, a cause of chronic conjunctivitis. The disease is sometimes referred to as either "Morax' disease" or as "Axenfeld's conjunctivitis", named after German ophthalmologist Theodor Axenfeld (1867–1930), who made his discovery of the bacillus during the same time period as did Morax.

In 1923, he became vice-president of the "International League Against Trachoma" with bacteriologist Charles Nicolle (1866–1936) serving as its president. In 1929, he published a treatise on the disorder titled Le Trachome. From 1892, he was editor of the journal Annales d'oculistique.

== Early life ==
Victor Morax was born on March 16, 1866, in a small villa near the Lake of Geneva. Morax's father was a doctor and it was known that he had two brothers.

== Career ==
Victor Morax worked in Louis Pasteur's laboratory where he pursued his interest in bacteriology. He later joined Parinaud as his assistant to study ophthalmology. In the 1900s, after Parinaud's passing, Morax went on to be nominated as the ophthalmologist of hospitals in Paris; he was primarily focusing on conjunctivitis and ocular asepsis.

In 1901, Morax developed an interest in trachoma and determined the root cause of acute trachoma. His interest in follicular conjunctivitis became prominent in his studies as he developed subgroups of conjunctivitis.

He continued his work on the bacteriologic as well as ophthalmology throughout his career. Morax discovered pneumococcus in acute conjunctivitis as well as diplobacillus in angular conjunctivitis with Axenfeld.

In 1903, he took over the Hopital Lariboisiere and over the span of 26 years, he was able to add more beds and update the ophthalmology department that drew in many new students.

After retirement in 1928, Morax's interest in the field remained constant and he continued his theories at the Pasteur Institute.

== Written works ==
- Maladies de la conjonctive et de la corné. Sémiologie oculaire. in: Pierre-Félix Lagrange (1857-1928) and Emile Valude (1857-1930)- Encyclopédie française d’ophtalmologie. Paris, 1903–1910.
- Précis d’ophthalmologie, Paris, 1907; fourth edition ca 1932.
- Glaucome et glaucomateux, Paris, 1921.
- Le trachome. with P. Petit, Paris, 1929.
