= Moraxella bovis =

Scientific classification
- Domain: Bacteria
- Kingdom: Pseudomonadati
- Phylum: Pseudomonadota
- Class: Gammaproteobacteria
- Order: Pseudomonadales
- Family: Moraxellaceae
- Genus: Moraxella
- Species: M. bovis

Binomial name
- Moraxella bovis (Hauduroy et al. 1937) Murray 1948 (Approved Lists 1980)

Species of bacterium

Moraxella bovis is a Gram-negative, aerobic, oxidase-positive rod-shaped bacterium. It is the cause of infectious bovine keratoconjunctivitis, a contagious ocular disease of cattle, referred to colloquially as pinkeye or New Forest eye. M. bovis was first associated with pinkeye in cattle 1915 in Bengal, India. M. bovis has been observed as an opportunistic pathogen in humans.

The restriction enzyme MboI, widely used in biotechnology, is isolated from this species.
