= Israel Aksenfeld =

Israel Aksenfeld (Yiddish: ישראל אקסענפעלד, c. 1787 in Nemirov, Podolia Governorate, Russian Empire – c. 1868 in Paris, France) was a Yiddish writer. Although he spoke other languages perfectly (Hebrew, Russian, Polish, German, possibly Ukrainian), he chose to write in Yiddish. Together with Solomon Ettinger, he was one of the first Yiddish-language writers of the 19th century and one of the most significant Yiddish writers to emerge before Mendele Mocher Sforim.

He spent the first period of his life among the Hasidim, being himself a disciple of R. Nahman Bratzlaver (from Bratslav, a town in Ukraine, in Yiddish: בראָסלעוו) and the companion of Nathan Bratzlaver (Nathan of Breslov), the editor and publisher of Nahman's works. Later he abandoned his early associations, and removed to Odessa. By self-education he acquired a wide knowledge of law, literature, and science. He practised as a notary public, and was also a prolific writer of fiction. Like nearly all Russo-Jewish novelists, Aksenfeld was a realist. He derived the themes of his works from contemporary Jewish life, describing with the pen of an artist the conditions, manners, and customs of the ghetto in the Russian Empire at the beginning of the eventful reign of Czar Nicholas I. He was the author of about twenty works, of which only five—one novel and four dramas—were printed. The most important of his dramatic works is the play in verse, Der erschter jiddischer Rekrut in Russland (1861), a tragedy which presents a remarkably vivid picture of the terrible commotion in the Russian ghetto when, in 1827, the ukase compelling the Jews to do military service was enforced for the first time (see Cantonist). His novel, Dos Sterntichl (1861) describes the seamy side of Ḥasidism, its intolerance, bigotry, and hypocrisy, and contrasts it with the fair-mindedness and honesty of progressive Judaism. Another work is Sefer Chasidim (1841).
