= Moraxella cuniculi =

Scientific classification
- Domain: Bacteria
- Kingdom: Pseudomonadati
- Phylum: Pseudomonadota
- Class: Gammaproteobacteria
- Order: Pseudomonadales
- Family: Moraxellaceae
- Genus: Moraxella
- Species: M. cuniculi

Binomial name
- Moraxella cuniculi Bøvre and Hagen 1984

Type strain
- ATCC 14688, CCUG 2154, CIP 73.17, ITG 3388, K 19, LMG 8382, LNP N 420, NCTC 10297

Synonyms
- Neisseria cuniculi

Species of bacterium

Moraxella cuniculi is a Gram-negative bacterium in the genus Moraxella, which was isolated from the oral mucosa of a rabbit in Germany. The previous name was Neisseria cuniculi.
