= Diploscapter pachys =

Scientific classification
- Kingdom: Animalia
- Phylum: Nematoda
- Class: Chromadorea
- Order: Rhabditida
- Family: Rhabditidae
- Genus: Diploscapter
- Species: D. pachys

Binomial name
- Diploscapter pachys Steiner, 1942

Species of roundworm

Diploscapter pachys is a species of nematode.

== Taxonomy ==
This species was described by G. Steiner in 1942. Its type locality is Lexington, Kentucky and its type host is Hoya carnosa.

The specific epithet pachys comes from the Greek παχύς pakhús meaning "thick".

== Description ==
Steiner described its size as "very small but remarkably plump". The female's total length is .31–.41 millimetres (0.012–0.016 in).

Males of this species have not been observed; this species reproduces asexually.

== Genetics ==
A 2017 genetic study showed this species only has one chromosome pair, which resulted from the fusion of six pairs.
