= Moraxella boevrei =

Scientific classification
- Domain: Bacteria
- Kingdom: Pseudomonadati
- Phylum: Pseudomonadota
- Class: Gammaproteobacteria
- Order: Pseudomonadales
- Family: Moraxellaceae
- Genus: Moraxella
- Species: M. boevrei

Binomial name
- Moraxella boevrei Kodjo et al. 1997

Type strain
- ATCC 700022, CCUG 35435, CIP 104716, DSM 14165, Kodjo 88365, NCTC 12925

Species of bacterium

Moraxella boevrei is a Gram-negative, oxidase- and catalase-positive, aerobic nonmotile bacterium in the genus Moraxella, which was isolated from the nasal microbiota of healthy goats in Lyon in France.
