= Moraxella pluranimalium =

Scientific classification
- Domain: Bacteria
- Kingdom: Pseudomonadati
- Phylum: Pseudomonadota
- Class: Gammaproteobacteria
- Order: Pseudomonadales
- Family: Moraxellaceae
- Genus: Moraxella
- Species: M. pluranimalium

Binomial name
- Moraxella pluranimalium Vela et al. 2009

Type strain
- CCUG 54913, CECT 7295, strain 248-01

Species of bacterium

Moraxella pluranimalium is a Gram-negative, aerobic, catalase- and oxidase-positive, non-spore-forming bacterium in the genus Moraxella, which was isolated from the nasal turbinate of a pig.
