= Moraxella caviae =

Scientific classification
- Domain: Bacteria
- Kingdom: Pseudomonadati
- Phylum: Pseudomonadota
- Class: Gammaproteobacteria
- Order: Pseudomonadales
- Family: Moraxellaceae
- Genus: Moraxella
- Species: M. caviae

Binomial name
- Moraxella caviae Henriksen and Bøvre 1968

Type strain
- ATCC 14659, Bövre ATCC14659, CCM 2627, CCUG 2132, CCUG 355, CIP 73.19, GP 11, LMG 5129, N62, NCTC 10293, NRCC 31003

Synonyms
- Neisseria caviae

Species of bacterium

Moraxella caviae is a Gram-negative bacterium in the genus Moraxella, which was isolated from the pharyngeal region and mouth of guinea pig.
