= Moraxella lincolnii =

Scientific classification
- Domain: Bacteria
- Kingdom: Pseudomonadati
- Phylum: Pseudomonadota
- Class: Gammaproteobacteria
- Order: Pseudomonadales
- Family: Moraxellaceae
- Genus: Moraxella
- Species: M. lincolnii

Binomial name
- Moraxella lincolnii Vandamme et al. 1993

Species of bacterium

Moraxella lincolnii is a Gram-negative bacterium in the genus Moraxella, which was isolated from the human respiratory tract.
