= Moraxella caprae =

Scientific classification
- Domain: Bacteria
- Kingdom: Pseudomonadati
- Phylum: Pseudomonadota
- Class: Gammaproteobacteria
- Order: Pseudomonadales
- Family: Moraxellaceae
- Genus: Moraxella
- Species: M. caprae

Binomial name
- Moraxella caprae Kodjo et al. 1995

Type strain
- ATCC 700019, CCUG 33296, CCUG 33297, CIP 104714, CIP 104715, DSM 19149, Kodjo 8897, Kodjo 8898, NCTC 12877

Species of bacterium

Moraxella caprae is a Gram-negative, aerobic, nonmotile bacterium in the genus Moraxella, which was isolated from the nasal flora of goats in Lyon in France.
