= Moraxella equi =

Scientific classification
- Domain: Bacteria
- Kingdom: Pseudomonadati
- Phylum: Pseudomonadota
- Class: Gammaproteobacteria
- Order: Pseudomonadales
- Family: Moraxellaceae
- Genus: Moraxella
- Species: M. equi

Binomial name
- Moraxella equi Hughes and Pugh 1970

Type strain
- A327/72, ATCC 25576, CCUG 14218, CCUG 4950, CIP 81.38, CIP 82.26, DSM 18027, Hug 68, LMG 5130, LMG 5315, NCTC 11012

Species of bacterium

Moraxella equi is a Gram-negative bacterium in the genus Moraxella, which was isolated from the eye of a horse.
