= Moraxella canis =

Scientific classification
- Domain: Bacteria
- Kingdom: Pseudomonadati
- Phylum: Pseudomonadota
- Class: Gammaproteobacteria
- Order: Pseudomonadales
- Family: Moraxellaceae
- Genus: Moraxella
- Species: M. canis

Binomial name
- Moraxella canis Jannes et al. 1993

Type strain
- ATCC 51391, CCM 4590, CCUG 26883, CCUG 8415 A, CIP 103801, DSM 18277, LMG 11194, UZG N7

Species of bacterium

Moraxella canis is a Gram-negative, oxidase-positive bacterium in the genus Moraxella. The organism is considered normal oral flora of cats and dogs, and it is not commonly attributed to infection in healthy humans. However, the organism has been reported to cause sepsis in an immunocompromised individual. Additionally, M. canis was isolated from a dog bite wound in Sweden and from an ulcerated supraclavicular lymph node of a patient. M. canis grows readily on blood and MacConkey agar.
