= Analytical profile index =

Microbiological method for rapid identification

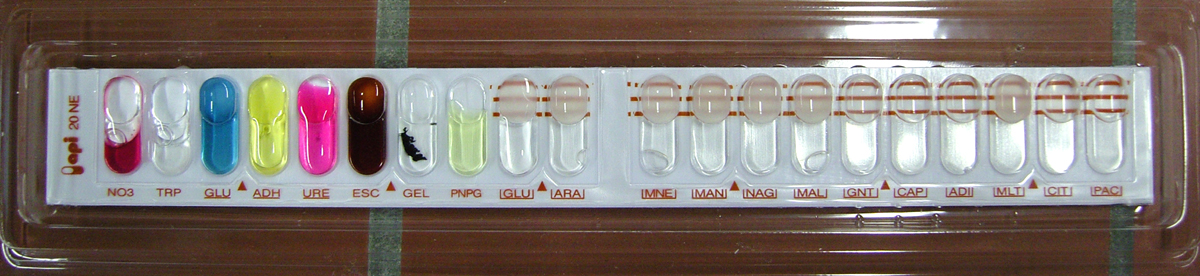
API 20NE Detection system after 24 hours incubation.

The analytical profile index, or API, is a classification system for bacteria based on biochemical tests. The system was developed to accelerate the speed of identifying clinically relevant bacteria. It can only be used to identify known species from an index. The data obtained are phenotypic traits. DNA sequence-based methods, including multi-locus sequence typing and even whole-genome sequencing, are increasingly used in the identification of bacterial species and strains. These newer methods can be used to complement or even replace the use of API testing in clinical settings.

== History ==
The analytical profile index (API) was invented in the 1970s in the United States by Pierre Janin of Analytab Products Inc. The API test system is currently manufactured by bioMérieux. The API range introduced a standardized and miniaturized version of existing techniques, which were considered complicated to perform and difficult to read.

== Description ==
Identification is only possible with a microbiological culture. API test strips consist of wells containing dehydrated substrates such as the redox substrates, electrogenic substrates and luminogenic substrates to detect enzymatic activity, usually related to the fermentation of carbohydrate or catabolism of proteins or amino acids by the inoculated organisms. A bacterial suspension is used to rehydrate each of the wells and the strips are incubated. During incubation, metabolism produces color changes that are either spontaneous or revealed by the addition of reagents. For example, when carbohydrates are fermented, the pH within the well decreases and that is indicated by a change in the color of the pH indicator. All test results are compiled to obtain a profile number, which is then compared with profile numbers in a commercial codebook (or online) to determine the identification of the bacterial species.

=== API-20E ===
Before starting a test, one must confirm the cultured bacteria are Enterobacteriaceae, this is done by a quick oxidase test for cytochrome coxidase. Enterobacteriaceae are typically oxidase negative, meaning they either do not use oxygen as an electron acceptor in the electron transport chain, or they use a different cytochrome enzyme for transferring electrons to oxygen. If the culture is determined to be oxidase-positive, alternative tests must be carried out to correctly identify the bacterial species. API-20E is specific for differentiating between members of the Gram-negative bacteria family Enterobacteriaceae. Another API system, API-Staph, is specific for Gram-positive bacteria, including Staphylococcus species, Micrococcus species, and related organisms.

=== API 20E/NE ===
The API 20E/NE system is a widely used biochemical test system designed for the rapid identification of Gram-negative bacteria. It specifically targets two groups: Enterobacteriaceae (API 20E) and non-Enterobacteriaceae (API 20NE). This system is particularly useful in clinical microbiology and environmental studies for identifying bacteria based on their biochemical activities.

=== How It Works ===
- Test Strips: The system consists of a plastic strip containing 20 small reaction tubes (microtubes), each containing different dehydrated substrates.
- Rehydration and Inoculation: To perform the test, the microtubes are rehydrated with a bacterial suspension. Each microtube is designed to detect specific enzymatic activities or carbohydrate fermentations characteristic of the bacteria being tested.
- Incubation: After inoculation, the strip is incubated for a period, usually 18-24 hours, at a specified temperature (often 35-37°C). During incubation, the bacteria interact with the substrates, leading to visible color changes if the reactions occur.
- Reading Results: After incubation, the results are interpreted by observing the color changes in each tube, which are indicative of positive or negative reactions. The pattern of reactions is compared to a reference database to identify the organism.
- Identification: Each reaction is scored numerically, and the cumulative score forms a profile number, which is then used to identify the organism through a database or identification software.
