= Moraxella nonliquefaciens =

Scientific classification
- Domain: Bacteria
- Kingdom: Pseudomonadati
- Phylum: Pseudomonadota
- Class: Gammaproteobacteria
- Order: Pseudomonadales
- Family: Moraxellaceae
- Genus: Moraxella
- Species: M. nonliquefaciens

Binomial name
- Moraxella nonliquefaciens VandLwoff 1939

Type strain
- ATCC 19975, BCRC 11230, CCM 5604, CCRC 11230, CCUG 348, CECT 465, CIP 68.36, DSM 6327, Henriksen 4663/62, IAM 12281, JCM 20443, NCTC 10464

Synonyms
- Bacillus duplex non liquefaciens

Species of bacterium

Moraxella nonliquefaciens is a Gram-negative bacterium in the genus Moraxella, which was isolated from the upper respiratory tract of humans. M. nonliquefaciens occasionally causes disease.
