= Günther Osche =

German academic (1926–2009)

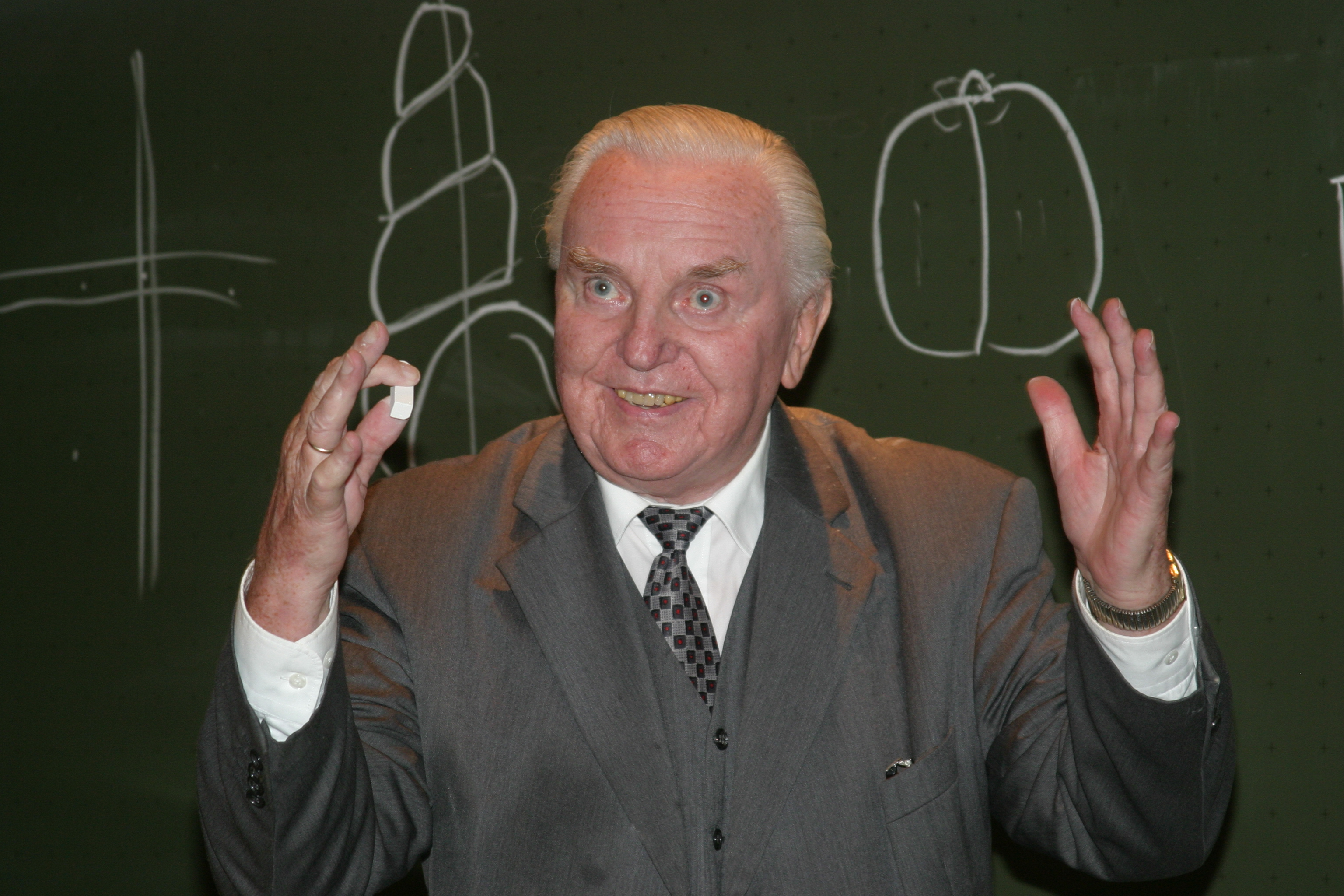
Prof.Dr. Guenther Osche on the occasion of the celebration of his 80th birthday, Freiburg im Breisgau, Germany

Günther Osche (also spelled Guenther Osche, born 7 August 1926 in Neustadt an der Weinstraße, died 2 February 2009 in Freiburg im Breisgau) was a German evolutionary biologist, ecologist and parasitologist.

He started his career with a research on nematodes having Hans-Jürgen Stammer (1899–1968) as his scientific supervisor. He is known to have raised the name Rhabditides elegans in the subgenus Caenorhabditis in 1952 in the history of the naming of the model worm Caenorhabditis elegans.

== Works ==
=== Articles ===
- Systematik und Phylogenie der Gattung Rhabditis (Nematoda). G. Osche, Zool. Jb. (Abt. 1), 81, pages 190–280, 1952
- Die Bedeutung der Osmoregulation und des Winkverhaltens für freilebende Nematoden. G. Osche, Zoomorphology, 1952
- Bau, Entwicklung und systematische Bedeutung der Cordons der Acuariidae (Nematoda) am Beispiel von Stammerinema soricis (Tiner 1951) gen. nov. G. Osche, Zeitschrift für Parasitenkunde, 1955
- Die bursa-und schwanzstrukturen und ihre aberrationen bei den strongylina (Nematoda) morphologische studien zum problem der pluri-und ... G. Osche, Zeitschrift für Morphologie und ökologie der Tiere, 1958

=== Books ===
- Die Welt der Parasiten. Zur Naturgeschichte des Schmarotzertums. 1966
- Das "Wesen" der biologischen Evolution. 1973
- Evolution. Grundlagen - Erkenntnisse - Entwicklungen der Abstammungslehre. 1979
- with von Arno Bogenrieder, Klaus-Günter Collatz, Hans Kössel : Lexikon der Biologie in acht Bänden. 1985

== Tributes ==
The genus of nematodes Oscheius is a tribute to Osche.
