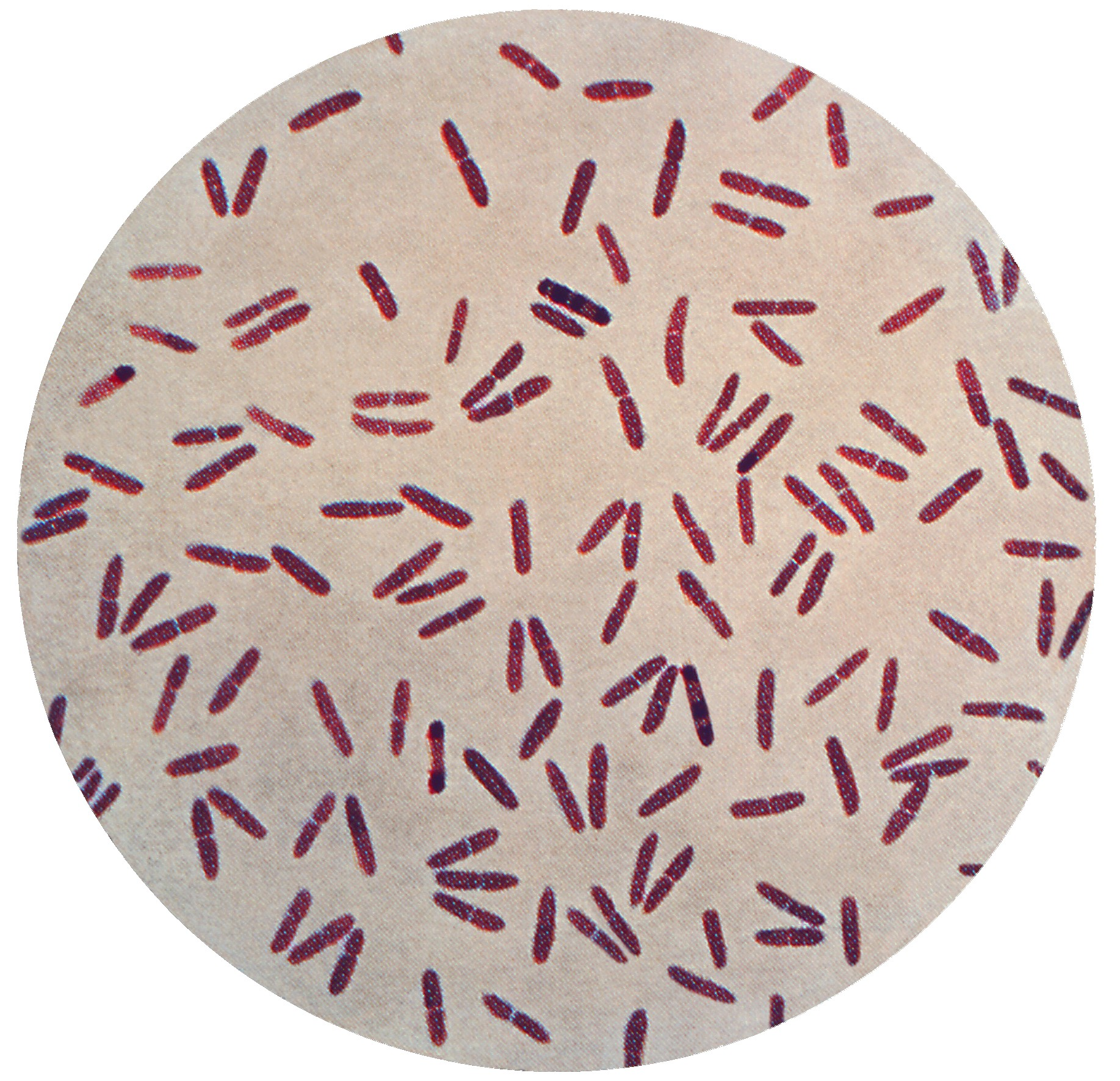
- Microscope view of Moraxella lacunata bacteria

Scientific classification
- Domain: Bacteria
- Kingdom: Pseudomonadati
- Phylum: Pseudomonadota
- Class: Gammaproteobacteria
- Order: Pseudomonadales
- Family: Moraxellaceae
- Genus: Moraxella
- Species: M. lacunata

Binomial name
- Moraxella lacunata (Eyre 1900) Lwoff 1939 (Approved Lists 1980)

= Moraxella lacunata =

Species of bacterium

Moraxella lacunata is a rod-shaped, Gram-negative, nonmotile bacterium, generally present as diploid pairs. It is typically regarded as a commensal organism of the upper respiratory tract. M. lacunata is associated with chronic conjunctivitis.

== History ==
Moraxella lacunata was first described independently by Victor Morax (1896) and Theodor Axenfeld (1897), hence the alternate name "Morax-Axenfeld diplobacilli" and the name of eye infection in humans is sometimes called Morax-Axenfeld conjunctivitis.

== Characters ==
It has the ability to change its morphology in laboratory. M. lacunata became shorter and tended to lose its Gram-negative staining characteristic when left out for 5 days. It also tended to retain these new characteristics on subsequent blood-agar transfers.

== Clinical significance ==
Infection occurs mainly in adults, but can occur at any age. It is characterized by:

- Chronic, mild angular blepharoconjunctivitis frequently localized on the lid at the outer canthus
- Typical erythema of the edges of the lids
- Slight maceration of the skin, most marked at the angles, especially the outer canthus
- Superficial infiltration of the cornea is not uncommon.
- The discharge is grayish yellow, adherent to the lashes, and accumulates mainly at the angles.
