= Prodontorhabditis =

Scientific classification
- Domain: Eukaryota
- Kingdom: Animalia
- Phylum: Nematoda
- Class: Chromadorea
- Order: Rhabditida
- Family: Rhabditidae
- Genus: Prodontorhabditis; Timm, 1961

Genus of roundworms

Prodontorhabditis is a genus of nematodes belonging to the family Rhabditidae.

The species of this genus are found in Europe and Central America.

Species:

- Prodontorhabditis anthobia (Schneider, 1937) Andrássy, 1983
- Prodontorhabditis gracilis Gagarin, 2000
- Prodontorhabditis grandistoma Mumtaz, Fatima, Jamal, Ahlawat, Tahseen & Ahmad, 2020
- Prodontorhabditis parvus Gagarin, 2000
- Prodontorhabditis pluvialis Timm, 1961
- Prodontorhabditis robustus Mumtaz, Fatima, Jamal, Ahlawat, Tahseen & Ahmad, 2020
- Prodontorhabditis wirthi Sudhaus, 1974
