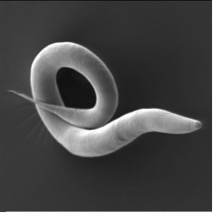
- Scanning electron micrograph of the nematode Caenorhabditis elegans

Scientific classification
- Kingdom: Animalia
- Phylum: Nematoda
- Class: Chromadorea
- Order: Rhabditida
- Family: Rhabditidae

Genera
- Bursilla; Caenorhabditis; Diploscapter; Halicephalobus; Macramphis; Mesorhabditis; Neorhabditus; Oscheius; Parasitorhabditus; Pelodera; Phasmarhabditis; Poikilolaimus; Protorhabditis; Rhabditis; Rhabditoides; Rhabditophanes; Rhitis; Teratorhabditis

Synonyms
- Mesorhabditidae; Peloderidae

= Rhabditidae =

Family of worms

The Rhabditidae are a family of nematodes which includes the model organism Caenorhabditis elegans.

== Genera ==
Movement of wild-type C. elegans

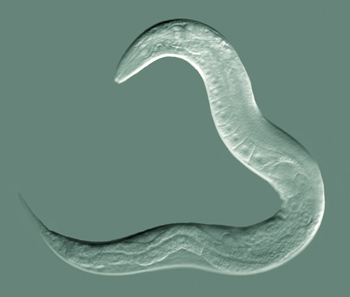
C. elegans hermaphrodite

=== Bursilla ===
- Bursilla monhysteria (Butschli, 1873)

=== Caenorhabditis ===
- Caenorhabditis brenneri Sudhaus & Kiontke, 2007
- Caenorhabditis briggsae
- Caenorhabditis dolichura
- Caenorhabditis elegans Maupas, 1900
- Caenorhabditis rara

=== Diploscapter ===
Genus Diploscapter

- Diploscapter bicornis
- Diploscapter coronata (Cobb, 1893)
- Diploscapter lycostoma
- Diploscapter pachys

=== Halicephalobus ===
- Halicephalobus gingivalis (Stefanski, 1954) Andrássy, 1984
- Halicephalobus mephisto Borgonie, García-Moyano, Litthauer, Bert, Bester, van Heerden, Möller, Erasmus & Onstott, 2011
- Halicephalobus similigaster (Andrássy, 1952)

=== Macramphis ===
- Macramphis stercorarius

=== Mesorhabditis ===
- Mesorhabditis acris
- Mesorhabditis irregularis
- Mesorhabditis oschei
- Mesorhabditis spiculigera

=== Neorhabditus ===
- Neorhabditus flagellicaudatus

=== Oscheius ===
- Oscheius carolinensis Ye et al., 2010
- Oscheius cyrus Kuhestani, Karimi, Shokoohi & Makhdoumi, 2022
- Oscheius dolichura (Schneider, 1866)
- Oscheius dolichuroides
- Oscheius guentheri, Sudhaus et al., 1994
- Oscheius insectivora
- Oscheius myriophila
- Oscheius onirici Torrini et al., 2015
- Oscheius tipulae (Lam and Webster, 1971)

=== Parasitorhabditus ===
- Parasitorhabditus acuminati
- Parasitorhabditus crypturgophila
- Parasitorhabditus obtusa
- Parasitorhabditus opaci

=== Pelodera ===
- Pelodera chitwoodi (Bassen, 1940)
- Pelodera conica
- Pelodera kolbi
- Pelodera punctata (Cobb, 1914)
- Pelodera strongyloides
- Pelodera teres (Schneider, 1866)
- Pelodera voelki

=== Phasmarhabditis ===
- Phasmarhabditis apuliae
- Phasmarhabditis bohemica
- Phasmarhabditis bonaquaense
- Phasmarhabditis californica
- Phasmarhabditis hermaphrodita (Schneider)
- Phasmarhabditis huizhouensis
- Phasmarhabditis neopapillosa
- Phasmarhabditis nidrosiensis
- Phasmarhabditis papillosa
- Phasmarhabditis tawfiki
- Phasmarhabditis valida

=== Poikilolaimus ===
- Poikilolaimus ernstmayri
- Poikilolaimus micoletzkyi
- Poikilolaimus piniperdae

=== Protorhabditis ===
- Protorhabditis anthobia
- Protorhabditis minuta
- Protorhabditis tristis
- Protorhabditis xylocola

=== Rhabditis ===
- Rhabditis aberrans
- Rhabditis marina
- Rhabditis maxima
- Rhabditis necromena
- Rhabditis sylvatica
- Rhabditis terricola

=== Rhabditoides ===
- Rhabditoides frugicola
- Rhabditoides giardi
- Rhabditoides inermis
- Rhabditoides longispina

=== Rhabditophanes ===
- Rhabditophanes aphodii
- Rhabditophanes insolitus
- Rhabditophanes schneideri

=== Rhitis ===
- Rhitis inermis Andrassy, 1982

=== Teratorhabditis ===
- Teratorhabditis boettgeri
- Teratorhabditis coroniger
- Teratorhabditis dentifera

== Phylogenetic studies ==
The analysis of sequences of three nuclear genes shows that the Diploscapter, Protorhabditis and Prodontorhabditis genera group together to form the 'Protorhabditis' group, the sister group of the Caenorhabditis species, all included in the 'Eurhabditis' group of Rhabditidae genera.
