= Infectious bovine keratoconjunctivitis =

Bacterial disease of cattle

Infectious bovine keratoconjunctivitis (IBK), also known as pinkeye, New Forest eye or blight, is a veterinary infection of cattle caused by Moraxella bovis, a Gram-negative, β-haemolytic, aerobic, rod-shaped bacterium. It is spread by direct contact or by flies serving as vectors. It is the most common ocular disease of cattle (mostly beef). IBK is similar to human pink eye and causes severe infection of the conjunctiva, edema, corneal opacity, and ulceration. This disease is highly contagious and occurs worldwide. Younger animals are more susceptible, but recovery with minimal damage is usual if they are treated early.

== Cause ==
Moraxella bovis is a Gram-negative rod-shaped aerobe. This bacterium is an obligate intracellular parasite of the mucous membranes, and can usually be isolated from the respiratory tract, vagina, and conjunctiva of healthy animals. Transmission of IBK is through direct contact with mucous membranes and their secretions and indirect contact where flies act as a mechanical vector. Asymptomatic carrier animals can also be source of infection.

== Predisposing factors ==
Ultraviolet (UV) radiation is implicated in cattle with no pigmentation around the eyelids and cattle with prominently placed eyes. Exudate from the sun-burnt skin around the eyes can contain bacteria and attracts flies. UV light also directly damages the corneal epithelium, leading to a breakdown in host innate immunity.

Dust, dried-up plants, tall vegetation, and oversized or incorrectly placed ear tags may cause mechanical damage to the eye and facilitate bacterial colonization.

The disease may be complicated by concurrent infection with viruses such as infectious bovine rhinotracheitis virus (bovine herpesvirus 1) or adenovirus, bacteria such as Mycoplasma boviculi or Listeria monocytogenes, or infestation by Thelazia, a nematode.

Vitamin A deficiency is also implicated.

IBK is most prevalent in summer and early autumn.

A recent Meat and Livestock Australia report "estimates that the disease costs Australian beef producers AU$23.5 million annually in lost production and treatment costs".

== Clinical signs and diagnosis ==
The bacteria invade the lacrimal glands of the eye, causing keratitis, uveitis, and corneal ulceration. Cattle show signs of pain, increased lacrimation, excessive blinking, and conjunctivitis. More severe cases may show systemic signs such as anorexia and weight loss. Chronic untreated cases can become blind. Diagnosis is usually based on the clinical signs, but the bacteria can be cultured from lacrimal swabs, or visualised on smears of lacrimal secretions.

== Treatment and control ==
Shade, insect repellent-impregnated ear tags, and lower stocking rates may help prevent IBK. Early identification of the disease also helps prevent spread throughout the herd. Treatment is with early systemic use of a long-acting antibiotic such as tetracycline or florfenicol. Subconjunctival injections with procaine penicillin or other antibiotics are also effective, providing a "bubble" of antibiotic which releases into the eye slowly over several days.

Anti-inflammatory therapy can help shorten recovery times, but topical corticosteroids should be used with care if corneal ulcers are present.

M. bovis uses several different serotyped fimbriae as virulence factors, consequently pharmaceutical companies have exploited this to create vaccines. However, currently available vaccines are not reliable.

== Vaccination ==
A vaccine, known as "Piliguard", is available in Australia. The vaccine contains three strains of Morexella bovis (SAH38, FLA 64, EPP 63) pilli antigen. This stimulates antibody production against the bacterial pilli to prevent their attachment and invasion of the conjunctiva. The company claims the vaccine reduces the incidence and severity of the disease in an individual animal which directly reduces animal suffering and production loss on top of limiting the spread of disease through the herd. This, in turn, reduces the amount of antibioitics and fly repellent needed during high-risk seasons. The vaccine is marketed in multidose vials and has an adjuvant to create a long-term subcutaneous depot. This means no booster shot is necessary, but severe local reaction can be seen in people who accidentally inoculate themselves. Calves as young as one week old can be treated and no meat, milk, or export slaughter withdrawal is needed.
