= Yizhi Jane Tao =

American biochemist

- Occupations: Professor of Biochemistry and Cell Biology at Rice University, mapped atomic structure of the influenza A virus nucleoprotein trimer, named among the top ten most influential Chinese of 2006 by a consortium of China’s leading media outlets

Yizhi Jane Tao is a Chinese biochemist, structural biologist, and professor of biochemistry and cell biology at Rice University in Houston, Texas. Professor Tao led a team of researchers to be the first to map the structure of the influenza A virus nucleoprotein to an atomic level, a feat which circulated widely in the popular press. She was named among the top ten most influential Chinese of 2006 by a consortium of China's leading media outlets including Phoenix Satellite Television, China News Service, Asia Newsweek, and World Journal.

All negative-sense RNA viruses encode a nucleoprotein that surrounds the virus and allows for replication. Tao discovered that the nucleoprotein for influenza A has a distinctive loop that is necessary for the viral genome to be organized into its double-helix hairpin structure. Tao then compared the amino acid sequences of different influenza viruses and found that the nucleoprotein loop she identified is conserved among influenza viruses. Since then, Tao has also solved the structure of a capsid protein coat for a double-stranded fungal RNA virus.

== Education ==
Born in China, Yizhi Jane Tao received a B.Sc. degree in biology from Peking University in Beijing, China in 1992. She later received her Ph.D. in biological sciences from Purdue University while studying bacteriophages under the German-American biophysicist Michael Rossmann, whose lab uncovered a 3D viral structure. She completed a postdoctoral fellowship under Stephen C. Harrison at Harvard University from 1999 to 2002, which also focused on uncovering virus structures. Upon completing her postdoctoral studies, Tao joined the faculty of Rice University, where she has made important contributions to the study of influenza, hepatitis, and birnaviruses. In 2018, Tao became a full professor at the university, and she currently leads The Tao Laboratory.

== Academic research ==
Research in the Tao Laboratory in the Department of BioSciences at Rice University focuses on RNA viruses. While RNA is known for being the intermediate between the genetic information in DNA and the proteins created from it, in RNA viruses, RNA contains the genetic information. Many RNA viruses can cause disease in humans, such as Hepatitis C, Ebola, HIV, and influenza. RNA viruses can also infect bacterial and yeast hosts. RNA viruses are categorized into single- or double-stranded and plus or minus sense. RNA viruses work by reverse transcription, where DNA is created from RNA templates. The reactions necessary for reverse transcription to occur are catalyzed by RNA-dependent RNA polymerases, a class of enzymes involved in replication and transcription.

The Tao Lab uses electron microscopy, X-ray crystallography, and other biochemical and biophysical methods to understand the infection mechanism of RNA viruses. The lab hopes to help prevent and control viral disease by understanding the mechanism behind these viruses.

=== Current Projects ===
Current projects in the Tao Lab are focused on Orsay virus, influenza viruses, picobirnavirus, ccFV-1, dinornavirus, and human astrovirus, some of which are described below.

==== Human Astrovirus ====
Astroviruses are small, single-stranded RNA viruses that can infect humans, birds, and other mammals. They are not surrounded by a viral envelope. Astroviruses have an icosahedral shape made of 20 identical equilateral triangular sides and are plus-sense, meaning the genetic information can be directly translated into proteins. Human astroviruses have a genome with approximately 7,000 bases. This genome encodes three important proteins: nonstructural proteins 1a and 1ab and the viral capsid protein (CP). The Tao Lab has determined the structure of the capsid protein core and surface spike. The lab also discovered that the capsid protein has a similar structure in astroviruses and the hepatitis E virus. The Tao Lab is currently investigating structural changes to the capsid protein that allows for the virus to infect a host cell even when treated with protease, which is used to slow the progression of other RNA virus infections.

==== Orsay Virus ====
The Tao Lab is working to better understand the Orsay virus life cycle. Caenorhabditis elegans is a model organism in biology research. Orsay virus is the only type of virus known to infect C. elegans worms. Orsay infection in C. elegans is chronic and not lethal. Since C. elegans are frequently handled in the lab and can remain infected with Orsay virus for a long time, they are a convenient way to study Orsay virus. The positive sense, single-stranded Orsay genome encodes an RNA polymerase, a viral capsid protein (CP) and a nonstructural protein delta. Previous Tao Lab research has discovered that bound CP-delta proteins form a fiber that is part of the infectious virion. The CP-delta head fiber is involved in receptor binding and host entry, helping the virus infect its host cell. The delta protein on its own is involved in nonlytic viral egress.

==== Influenza Viruses ====
Influenza viruses, also called the “flu” and known for the annual vaccine, are a serious public health concern. There are four types of influenza viruses: A, B, C, and D. Influenza D Virus (IDV) was first isolated in 2011. IDV infects cattle, pigs, and other ruminants. The Tao Lab aims to understand how the IDV nonstructural protein 1 (NS1) compares to the Influenza A Virus nonstructural protein 1. The lab also hopes to uncover the mechanism that creates IDV matrix proteins M1 and M2. Understanding the structure and function of NS1 and M1 proteins will help the lab understand IDV replication and pathogenesis.

== See also ==
- Timeline of women in science
