= Sequence Ontology =

Ontology for annotation of sequences

SO

Content
- Description: Biological sequence ontology

Contact
- Research center: WormBase, FlyBase, the Mouse Genome Informatics group, and the Sanger Institute

Access
- Website: www.sequenceontology.org

The Sequence Ontology (SO) is an ontology suitable for describing biological sequences. It is designed to make the naming of DNA sequence features and variants consistent and therefore machine-readable and searchable.
