= Parastrachia japonensis =

- Maternal vibration - an important cue for embryo hatching

Scientific classification
- Kingdom: Animalia
- Phylum: Arthropoda
- Clade: Pancrustacea
- Class: Insecta
- Order: Hemiptera
- Suborder: Heteroptera
- Family: Parastrachiidae
- Genus: Parastrachia
- Species: P. japonensis

Binomial name
- Parastrachia japonensis (Scott, 1880)

Species of true bug

Parastrachia japonensis is a species of true bug belonging to the family Parastrachiidae. It is one of the two species in the genus, both from Eastern Asia. Known colloquially as the Japanese Red Bug, it is one of the few species of insect where mothers care for their young, gathering food for them. They exclusively feed on the drupes of the tree Schoepfia jasinodora.

Caenorhabditis japonica is a species of nematodes found in the wild non-parasitically associated with P. japonensis.
