= WormBook =

Biology journal

WormBook.org
- The online review of C. elegans biology
- Published: 2005
- Website: wormbook.org; genetics.org/content/wormbook; www.ncbi.nlm.nih.gov/books/NBK19662/

WormBook is an open access, comprehensive collection of original, peer-reviewed chapters covering topics related to the biology of the nematode worm Caenorhabditis elegans (C. elegans). WormBook also includes WormMethods, an up-to-date collection of methods and protocols for C. elegans researchers.

WormBook is the online text companion to WormBase, the C. elegans model organism database. Capitalizing on the World Wide Web, WormBook links in-text references (e.g. genes, alleles, proteins, literature citations) with primary biological databases such as WormBase and PubMed. C. elegans was the first multicellular organism to have its genome sequenced and is a model organism for studying developmental genetics and neurobiology.

== Contents ==
The content of WormBook is categorized into the sections listed below, each filled with a variety of relevant chapters. These sections include:

- Genetics and genomics
- Molecular biology
- Biochemistry
- Cell Biology
- Signal transduction
- Developmental biology
- Post-embryonic development
- Sex-determination systems
- The germ line
- Neurobiology and behavior
- Evolution and ecology
- Disease models and drug discovery
- WormMethods
