= Caretaker gene =

Genes that encode genome-stabilizing products

Caretaker genes encode products that stabilize the genome. Fundamentally, mutations in caretaker genes lead to genomic instability. Tumor cells arise from two distinct classes of genomic instability: mutational instability arising from changes in the nucleotide sequence of DNA and chromosomal instability arising from improper rearrangement of chromosomes.

Changes in the genome that allow uncontrolled cell proliferation or cell immortality are responsible for cancer. It is believed that the major changes in the genome that lead to cancer arise from mutations in tumor suppressor genes. In 1997, Kinzler and Bert Vogelstein grouped these cancer susceptibility genes into two classes: "caretakers" and "gatekeepers". In 2004, a third classification of tumor suppressor genes was proposed by Franziska Michor, Yoh Iwasa, and Martin Nowak; "landscaper" genes. In contrast to caretaker genes, gatekeeper genes encode gene products that act to prevent growth of potential cancer cells and prevent accumulation of mutations that directly lead to increased cellular proliferation.

The third classification of genes, the landscapers, encode products that, when mutated, contribute to the neoplastic growth of cells by fostering a stromal environment conducive to unregulated cell proliferation.

== Genes in context ==
=== Pathways to cancer via the caretakers ===
The process of DNA replication inherently places cells at risk of acquiring mutations. Thus, caretaker genes are vitally important to cellular health. Rounds of cell replication allow fixation of mutated genes into the genome. Caretaker genes provide genome stability by preventing the accumulation of these mutations.

Factors that contribute to genome stabilization include proper cell-cycle checkpoints, DNA repair pathways, and other actions that ensure cell survival following DNA damage. Specific DNA maintenance operations encoded by caretaker genes include nucleotide excision repair, base excision repair, non-homologous end joining recombination pathways, mismatch repair pathways, and telomere metabolism.

Loss of function mutations in caretaker genes allow mutations in other genes to survive that can result in increased conversion of a normal cell to a neoplastic cell, a cell that; (1) divides more often than it should or (2) does not die when conditions warrant cell death. Thus, caretaker genes do not directly regulate cell proliferation. Instead, they prevent other mutations from surviving for example by slowing the cell division process to enable DNA repair to complete, or by initiating apoptosis of the cell. In genetic knock-out and rescue experiments, restoration of a caretaker gene from the mutated form to the wildtype version does not limit tumorigenesis. This is because caretaker genes only indirectly contribute to the pathway to cancer.

Cells deficient in a DNA repair process tend to accumulate unrepaired DNA damages. Cells defective in apoptosis tend to survive even with excessive DNA damage, thus permitting replication of the damaged DNA and consequently carcinogenic mutations. Some key caretaker proteins that contribute to cell survival by acting in DNA repair processes when the level of damage is manageable, become executioners by inducing apoptosis when there is excess DNA damage.

Inactivation of caretaker genes is environmentally equivalent to exposing the cell to mutagens incessantly. For example, a mutation in a caretaker gene coding for a DNA repair pathway that leads to the inability to properly repair DNA damage could allow uncontrolled cell growth. This is the result of mutations of other genes that accumulate unchecked as a result of faulty gene products encoded by the caretakers.

In addition to providing genomic stability, caretakers also provide chromosomal stability. Chromosomal instability resulting from dysfunctional caretaker genes is the most common form of genetic instability that leads to cancer in humans. In fact, it has been proposed that these caretaker genes are responsible for many hereditary predispositions to cancers.

In individuals predisposed to cancer via mutations in caretaker genes, a total of three subsequent somatic mutations are required to acquire the cancerous phenotype. Mutations must occur in the remaining normal caretaker allele in addition to both alleles of gatekeeper genes within that cell for the said cell to turn to neoplasia. Thus, the risk of cancer in these affected populations is much less when compared to cancer risk in families predisposed to cancer via the gatekeeper pathway.

=== Pathways to cancer via the gatekeepers ===
In many cases, gatekeeper genes encode a system of checks and balances that monitor cell division and death. When tissue damage occurs, for example, products of gatekeeper genes ensure that balance of cell growth over cellular death remains in check. In the presence of competent gatekeeper genes, mutations of other genes do not lead to on-going growth imbalances.

Mutations altering these genes lead to irregular growth regulation and differentiation. Each cell type has only one, or at least only very few, gatekeeper genes. If a person is predisposed to cancer, they have inherited a mutation in one of two copies of a gatekeeper gene. Mutation of the alternate allele leads to progression to neoplasia.

Historically, the term gatekeeper gene was first coined in association with the APC gene, a tumor suppressor that is consistently found to be mutated in colorectal tumors. Gatekeeper genes are in fact specific to the tissues in which they reside.

The probability that mutations occur in other genes increases when DNA repair pathway mechanisms are damaged as a result of mutations in caretaker genes. Thus, the probability that a mutation will take place in a gatekeeper gene increases when the caretaker gene has been mutated.

Apoptosis, or induced cell suicide, usually serves as a mechanism to prevent excessive cellular growth. Gatekeeper genes regulate apoptosis. However, in instances where tissue growth or regrowth is warranted, these signals must be inactivated or net tissue regeneration would be impossible. Thus, mutations in growth-controlling genes would lead to the characteristics of uncontrolled cellular proliferation, neoplasia, while in a parallel cell that had no mutations in the gatekeeper function, simple cell death would ensue.

=== Pathways to cancer via the landscapers ===
A third group of genes in which mutations lead to a significant susceptibility to cancer is the class of landscaper genes. Products encoded by landscaper genes do not directly affect cellular growth, but when mutated, contribute to the neoplastic growth of cells by fostering stromal environments conducive to unregulated cell proliferation.

Landscaper genes encode gene products that control the microenvironment in which cells grow. Growth of cells depends both on cell-to-cell interactions and cell-to-extracellular matrix (ECM) interactions. Mechanisms of control via regulation of extracellular matrix proteins, cellular surface markers, cellular adhesion molecules, and growth factors have been proposed.

Cells communicate with each other via the ECM through both direct contact and through signaling molecules. Stromal cell abnormalities arising from gene products coded by faulty landscaper genes could induce abnormal cell growth on the epithelium, leading to cancer of that tissue.

Biochemical cascades consisting of signaling proteins occur in the ECM and play an important role to the regulation of many aspects of cell life. Landscaper genes encode products that determine the composition of the membranes in which cells live. For example, large molecular weight glycoproteins and proteoglycans have been found to in association with signaling and structural roles. There exist proteolytic molecules in the ECM that are essential for clearing unwanted molecules, such as growth factors, cell adhesion molecules, and others from the space surrounding cells. It is proposed that landscaper genes control the mechanisms by which these factors are properly cleared. Different characteristics of these membranes lead to different cellular effects, such as differing rates of cell proliferation or differentiation. If, for example, the ECM is disrupted, incoming cells, such as those of the immune system, can overload the area and release chemical signals that induce abnormal cell proliferation. These conditions lead to an environment conducive to tumor growth and the cancerous phenotype.

== Gatekeepers, caretakers, and cellular aging ==
Because mechanisms that control the accumulation of damage through the lifetime of a cell are essential to longevity, it is logical that caretaker and gatekeeper genes play a significant role in cellular aging. Increased activity of caretaker genes postpones aging, increasing lifespan. This is because of the regulatory function associated with caretaker genes in maintaining the stability of the genome. The actions of caretaker genes contribute to increasing lifespan of the cell.

A specific purpose of caretaker genes has been outlined in chromosomal duplication. Caretakers have been identified as crucial to encoding products that maintain the telomeres. It is believed that degradation of telomeres, the ends of chromosomes, through repeated cell cycle divisions, is a main component of cellular aging and death.

It has been suggested that gatekeeper genes confer beneficial anti-cancer affects but may provide deleterious effects that increase aging. This is because young organisms experiencing times of rapid growth necessitate significant anti-cancer mechanisms. As the organism ages, however, these formerly beneficial pathways become deleterious by inducing apoptosis in cells of renewable tissues, causing degeneration of the structure. Studies have shown an increased expression of pro-apoptotic genes in age-related pathologies. This is because the products of gatekeeper genes are directly involved in coding for cellular growth and proliferation.

However, dysfunctional caretaker genes do not always lead to a cancerous phenotype. For example, defects in nucleotide excision repair pathways are associated with premature aging phenotypes in diseases such as Xeroderma pigmentosum and Trichothiodystrophy. These patients exhibit brittle hair, nails, scaly skin, and hearing loss – characteristics associated with simple human aging. This is important because the nucleotide excision repair pathway is a mechanism thought to be encoded by a caretaker gene. Geneticists studying these premature-aging syndromes propose that caretaker genes that determine cell fate also play a significant role in aging. Accumulation of DNA damage with age may be especially prevalent in the central nervous system because of low DNA repair capability in postmitotic brain tissue.

Similarly, gatekeeper genes have been identified as having a role in aging disorders that exhibit mutations in such genes without an increased susceptibility to cancer. Experiments with mice that have increased gatekeeper function in the p53 gene show reduced cancer incidence (due to the protective activities of products encoded by p53) but a faster rate of aging.

Cellular senescence, also encoded by a gatekeeper gene, is arrest of the cell cycle in the G1 phase. Qualitative differences have been found between senescent cells and normal cells, including differential expression of cytokines and other factors associated with inflammation. It is believed that this may contribute, in part, to cellular aging.

In sum, although mechanisms encoded by gatekeeper and caretaker genes to protect individuals from cancer early in life, namely induction of apoptosis or senescence, later in life these functions may promote the aging phenotype.

== Mutations in context ==
It has been proposed that mutations in gatekeeper genes could, to an extent, offer a sort of selective advantage to the individual in which the change occurs. This is because cells with these mutations are able to replicate at a faster rate than nearby cells. This is known as "increased somatic fitness". Caretaker genes, on the other hand, confer selective disadvantage because the result is inherently decreased cellular success. However, increased somatic fitness could also arise from a mutation in a caretaker gene if mutations in tumor suppressor genes increase the net reproductive rate of the cell.

Although mutations in gatekeeper genes may lead to the same result as those of caretaker genes, namely cancer, the transcripts that gatekeeper genes encode are significantly different from those encoded by caretaker genes.

In many cases, gatekeeper genes encode a system of checks and balances that monitor cell division and death. In cases of tissue damage, for example, gatekeeper genes would ensure that balance of cell growth over cellular death remains in check. In the presence of competent gatekeeper genes, mutations of other genes would not lead to on-going growth imbalances.

Whether or not mutations in these genes confer beneficial or deleterious effects to the animal depends partially on the environmental context in which these changes occur, a context encoded by the landscaper genes. For example, tissues of the skin and colon reside in compartments of cells that rarely mix with one another. These tissues are replenished by stem cells. Mutations that occur within these cell lineages remain confined to the compartment in which they reside, increasing the future risk of cancer. This is also protective, however, because the cancer will remain confined to that specific area, rather than invading the rest of the body, a phenomenon known as metastasis.

In areas of the body compartmentalized into small subsets of cells, mutations that lead to cancer most often begin with caretaker genes. On the other hand, cancer progression in non-compartmentalized or large cell populations may be a result of initial mutations in gatekeepers.

These delineations offer a suggestion why different types of tissue within the body progress to cancer by differing mechanisms.

== Notes ==
Although the classification of tumor suppressor genes into these categories is helpful to the scientific community, the potential role of many genes cannot be reliably identified as the functions of many genes are rather ill-defined. In some contexts, genes exhibit discrete caretaker function while in other situations gatekeeper characteristics are recognized. An example of one such gene is p53. Patients with Li-Fraumeni syndrome, for example, have mutations in the p53 gene that suggest caretaker function. p53 has an identified role, however, in regulating the cell cycle as well, which is an essential gatekeeper function.
