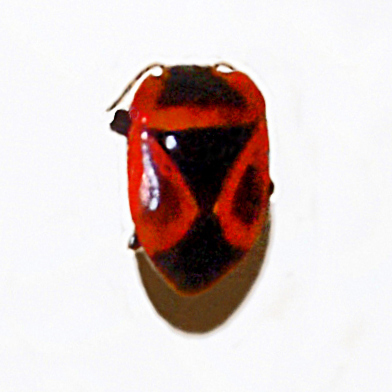
- Dismegistus costalis from Shewa. Museum specimen

Scientific classification
- Kingdom: Animalia
- Phylum: Arthropoda
- Clade: Pancrustacea
- Class: Insecta
- Order: Hemiptera
- Suborder: Heteroptera
- Family: Parastrachiidae
- Genus: Dismegistus
- Species: D. costalis

Binomial name
- Dismegistus costalis Reiche & Fairmaire, 1849

= Dismegistus costalis =

Species of true bug

Dismegistus costalis is a species of true bugs belonging to the family Parastrachiidae.

== Distribution ==
This species is present in Ethiopia.
