= LITE-1 =

LITE-1 is a novel photoreceptor found in Caenorhabditis elegans. It exhibits blue light photoreceptor activity. Is involved in several processes, including negative phototaxis, phototransduction, and response to UV light. Many organisms have photosensitive proteins, yet only two types of photoreceptors, opsins and cryptochromes, have been discovered in metazoans until LITE-1. This photoreceptor is much more efficient at absorbing both ultraviolet light, 10 to 100 times greater than the two other types found in the animal kingdom.

== Structure and Function ==
Structural models show LITE-1 is a tetramer containing four subunits with a reversed membrane topology (C-terminus extracellular, N-terminus intracellular), within each subunit has seven transmembrane (7-TM) helices. The overall structure resembles insect olfactory and gustatory receptors which are tetrameric ion channels. Depending where light hits it can be either forward or reverse acceleration. The exact mechanism is still under investigation.

A pocket was found likely holding a light-sensitive molecule (chromophore) with other important cysteine to help attach it. Light is absorbed, energy then passes through certain amino acids to the chromophore changing the shape of the protein allowing a chemical reaction opening the ion channel. Additionally to light responses, the protein is regulated by redox conditions responding to Hydrogen peroxide (H_{2}0_{2}), cysteine residues such as C44, C258, and C394 further establishing how essential it is to the protein. LITE-1 is also responsive to oxidative stress signals. Animals lacking in the protein Peroxiredoxin PRDX-2 is seen to reduce light-induced responses as it mediates redox (oxidation-reduction) mechanism.

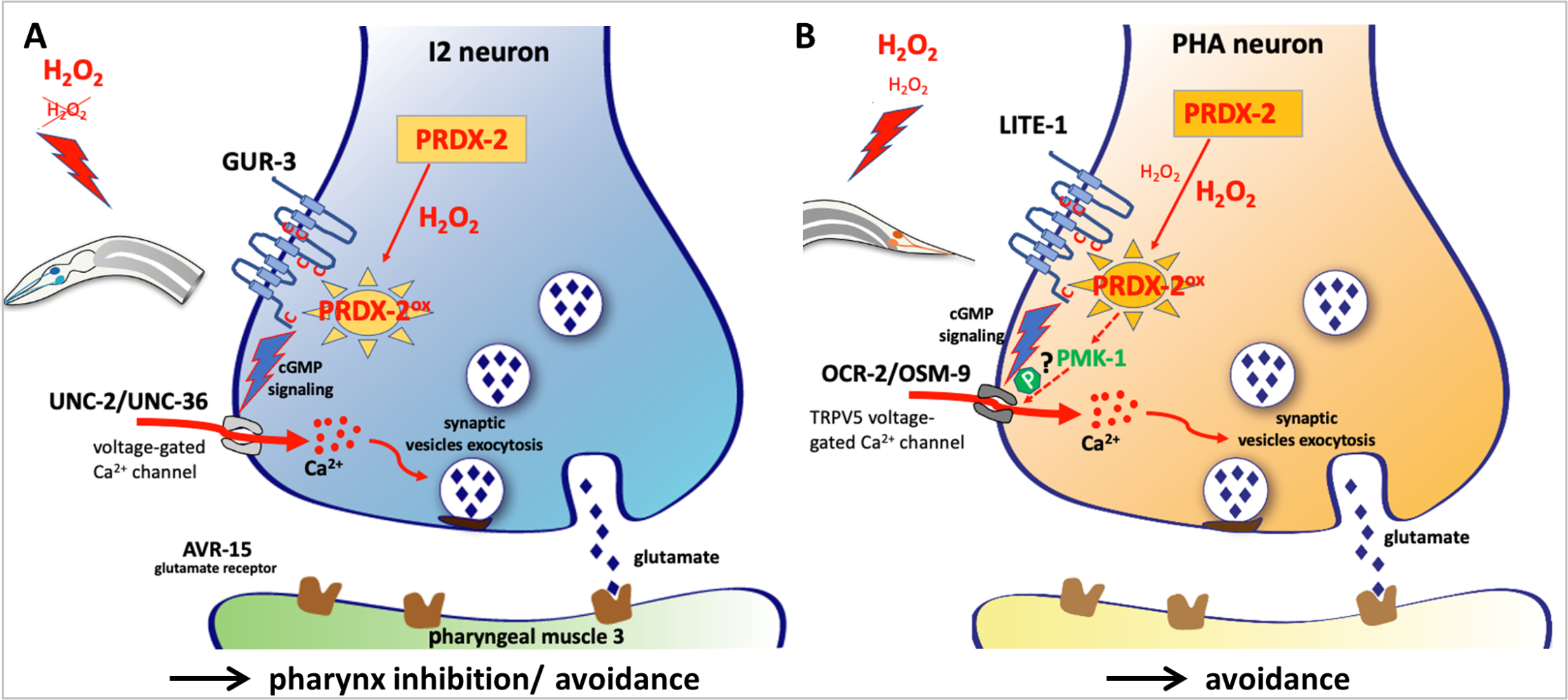
Mechanism of (H_{2}0_{2}) induced activation oxidizing PRDX-2 leading to LITE-1 or GUR-3 activation

=== Neural Function ===
Relating to insects sensory receptors, it expresses in multiple neurons such as AVG, PVT, and ASK. The loss LITE-1 reduces light-avoidance behavior yet when restoring particularly to the AVG neuron the response can occur while PVT and ASK are contributors they are not essential. AVG is responsible for the forward and reversal acceleration escape response, forming synapses with neurons that involve reversal acceleration.

=== Similar protein ===
GUR-3 is structurally similar belonging to the same protein family, both responding light-related signal and having oxidative reactions. Key differences however is LITE-1 is more effective as a light receptor capable of working on its own or together while on the other hand GUR-3 is less effective alone mainly detecting chemical signals.

== Biological Role ==
Caenorhabditis elegans anatomy

Additionally, in the presence of BBSome protein complex, in which are associated with Bardet-Biedl syndrome (BBS) a rare genetic mutation, promotes the stability of LITE-1. The BBSome inhibits DLK-MAPK signaling, in turn preserving LITE-1 levels that would otherwise lead to its degradation. This affects the ASH photosensory neurons located at the head which allows for light-induced avoidence behaviors to occur as it is C. elegans defense against environmental hazards.

=== X-Ray Avoidance ===
In a 2023 study, responses to X-Ray stimulation was tested on C. elegans of different variants including a wild type, lacking in LITE-1, and lacking in GUR-3. The wild type worms displayed locomotory avoidance behavior while the ones lacking in LITE-1 failed to respond whereas worms lacking in GUR-3 had normal reactions. This indicates that LITE-1, but not GUR-3, mediates X-ray-induced avoidance.
