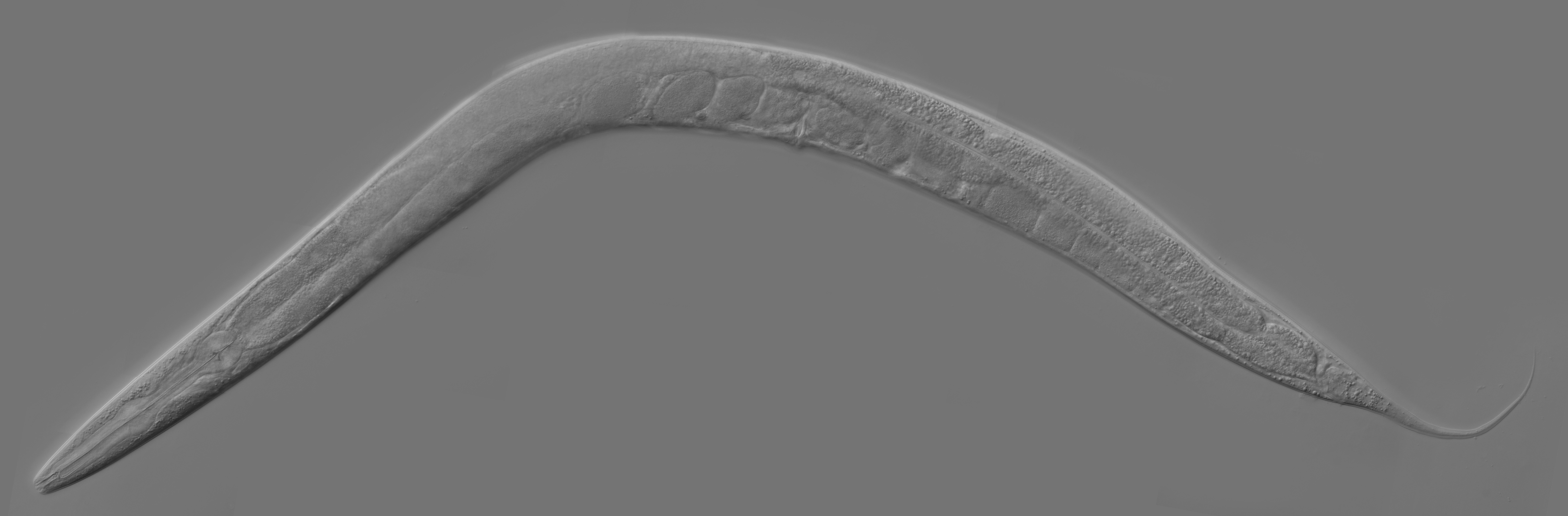
- An adult hermaphrodite C. elegans worm

Scientific classification
- Kingdom: Animalia
- Phylum: Nematoda
- Class: Chromadorea
- Order: Rhabditida
- Family: Rhabditidae
- Genus: Caenorhabditis
- Species: C. elegans

Binomial name
- Caenorhabditis elegans (Maupas, 1900)

Subspecies
- Caenorhabditis elegans var. Bergerac (for instance strain BO); Caenorhabditis elegans var. Bristol (for instance strain N2)

= Caenorhabditis elegans =

Free-living species of nematode

Caenorhabditis elegans (/ˌsiːnoʊræbˈdaɪtəs ˈɛləɡæns/) is a free-living transparent nematode about 1 mm in length that lives in temperate soil environments. It is the type species of its genus. The name is a blend of the Greek caeno- 'recent', rhabditis 'rod-like', and Latin elegans 'elegant'. In 1900, Maupas initially named it Rhabditis elegans. Osche placed it in the subgenus Caenorhabditis in 1952, and in 1955, Dougherty raised Caenorhabditis to the status of genus.

C. elegans is an unsegmented pseudocoelomate and lacks respiratory or circulatory systems. Most of these nematodes are hermaphrodites and a few are males. Males have specialised tails for mating that include spicules.

In 1963, Sydney Brenner proposed research into C. elegans, primarily in the area of neuronal development. In 1974, he began research into the molecular and developmental biology of C. elegans, which has since been extensively used as a model organism. It was the first multicellular organism to have its whole genome sequenced, and in 2019 it was the first organism to have its connectome (neuronal "wiring diagram") completed.

As of 2024, four Nobel prizes have been won for work done on C. elegans.

== Anatomy ==
Movement of wild-type

C. elegans is unsegmented, vermiform, and bilaterally symmetrical. It has a cuticle (a strong outer covering, as an exoskeleton), four main epidermal cords, and a fluid-filled pseudocoelom (body cavity). It also has some of the same organ systems as similar larger animals. About one in a thousand individuals is male and the rest are hermaphrodites. The basic anatomy of C. elegans includes a mouth, pharynx, intestine, gonad, and collagenous cuticle. Like all nematodes, they have neither a circulatory nor a respiratory system. The four bands of muscles that run the length of the body are connected to a neural system that allows the muscles to move the animal's body only as dorsal bending or ventral bending, but not left or right, except for the head, where the four muscle quadrants are wired independently from one another. When a wave of dorsal/ventral muscle contractions proceeds from the back to the front of the animal, the animal is propelled backwards. When a wave of contractions is initiated at the front and proceeds posteriorly along the body, the animal is propelled forwards. Because of this dorsal/ventral bias in body bends, any normal living, moving individual tends to lie on either its left side or its right side when observed crossing a horizontal surface. A set of ridges on the lateral sides of the body cuticle, the alae, is believed to give the animal added traction during these bending motions.

Lateral (left) side of an adult-stage hermaphrodite

Tissues of an adult C. elegans

Size and morphology of different C. elegans cells

In relation to lipid metabolism, C. elegans does not have any specialized adipose tissues, a pancreas, a liver, or even blood to deliver nutrients compared to mammals. Neutral lipids are instead stored in the intestine, epidermis, and embryos. The epidermis corresponds to the mammalian adipocytes by being the main triglyceride depot.

The pharynx is a muscular food pump in the head of C. elegans, which is triangular in cross-section. This grinds food and transports it directly to the intestine. A set of "valve cells" connects the pharynx to the intestine, but how this valve operates is not understood. After digestion, the contents of the intestine are released via the rectum, as is the case with all other nematodes. No direct connection exists between the pharynx and the excretory canal, which functions in the release of liquid urine.

Males have a single-lobed gonad, a vas deferens, and a tail specialized for mating, which incorporates spicules. Hermaphrodites have two ovaries, oviducts, and spermatheca, and a single uterus.

Anatomical diagram of a male C. elegans

Video of C. elegans with pencil for scale

There are 302 neurons in C. elegans, approximately one-third of all the somatic cells in the whole body. Many neurons contain dendrites which extend from the cell to receive neurotransmitters or other signals, and a process that extends to the nerve ring (the "brain") for a synaptic connection with other neurons. C. elegans has excitatory cholinergic and inhibitory GABAergic motor neurons which connect with body wall muscles to regulate movement. In addition, these neurons and other neurons such as interneurons use a variety of neurotransmitters to control behaviors.

=== Gut granules ===
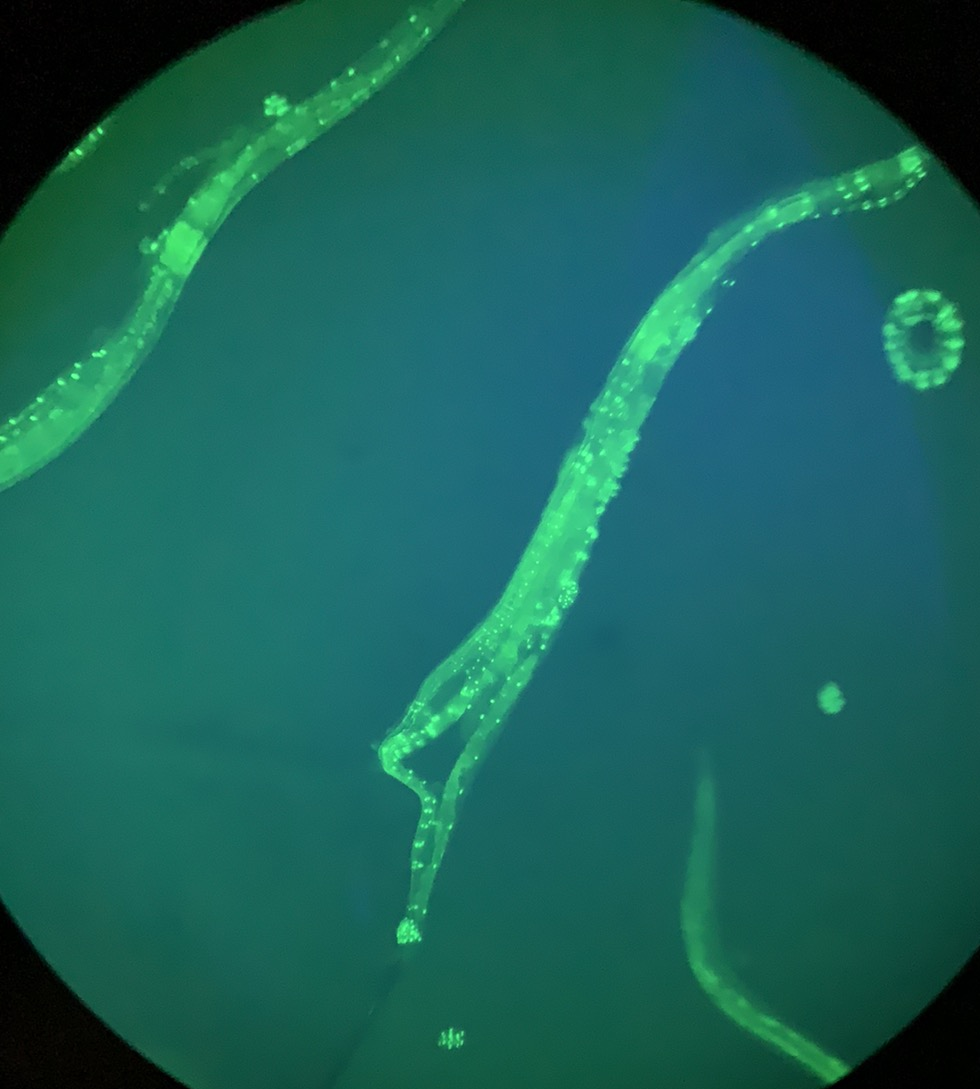
C. elegans under a microscope

Numerous gut granules are present in the intestine of C. elegans, the functions of which are still not fully known, as are many other aspects of this nematode, despite the many years that it has been studied. These gut granules are found in all of the Rhabditida orders. They are very similar to lysosomes in that they feature an acidic interior and the capacity for endocytosis, but they are considerably larger, reinforcing the view of their being storage organelles. A particular feature of the granules is that when they are observed under ultraviolet light, they react by emitting an intense blue fluorescence. Another phenomenon seen is termed 'death fluorescence'. As the worms die, a dramatic burst of blue fluorescence is emitted. This death fluorescence typically takes place in an anterior to posterior wave that moves along the intestine, and is seen in both young and old worms, whether subjected to lethal injury or peacefully dying of old age.

Many theories have been posited on the functions of the gut granules, with earlier ones being eliminated by later findings. They are thought to store zinc as one of their functions. Recent chemical analysis has identified the blue fluorescent material they contain as a glycosylated form of anthranilic acid (AA). The need for the large amounts of AA the many gut granules contain is questioned. One possibility is that the AA is antibacterial and used in defense against invading pathogens. Another possibility is that the granules provide photoprotection; the bursts of AA fluorescence entail the conversion of damaging UV light to relatively harmless visible light. This is seen as a possible link to the melanin–containing melanosomes.

== Reproduction ==
The hermaphroditic worm is considered to be a specialized form of self-fertile female, as its soma is female. The hermaphroditic germline produces male gametes first, and lays eggs through its uterus after internal fertilization. Hermaphrodites produce all their sperm in the L4 stage (150 sperm cells per gonadal arm) and then produce only oocytes. The hermaphroditic gonad acts as an ovotestis with sperm cells being stored in the same area of the gonad as the oocytes until the first oocyte pushes the sperm into the spermatheca (a chamber wherein the oocytes become fertilized by the sperm).

The male can inseminate the hermaphrodite, which will preferentially use male sperm (both types of sperm are stored in the spermatheca).

Once he recognizes a hermaphrodite worm, the male nematode begins tracing the hermaphrodite with his tail until he reaches the vulval region. The male then probes the region with his spicules to locate the vulva, inserts them, and releases sperm.

The sperm of C. elegans is amoeboid, lacking flagella and acrosomes. When self-inseminated, the wild-type worm lays about 300 eggs. When inseminated by a male, the number of progeny can exceed 1,000. Hermaphrodites do not typically mate with other hermaphrodites. At 20 °C, the laboratory strain of C. elegans (N2) has an average lifespan around 2–3 weeks and a generation time of 3 to 4 days.

C. elegans has five pairs of autosomes and one pair of sex chromosomes. Sex in C. elegans is based on an X0 sex-determination system. Hermaphrodites of C. elegans have a matched pair of sex chromosomes (XX); the rare males have only one sex chromosome (X0).

=== Sex determination ===
C. elegans are mostly hermaphroditic organisms, producing both sperms and oocytes. Males do occur in the population in a rate of approximately 1 in 200 hermaphrodites, but the two sexes are highly differentiated. Males differ from their hermaphroditic counterparts in that they are smaller and can be identified through the shape of their tail. C.elegans reproduce through a process called androdioecy. This means that they can reproduce in two ways: either through self-fertilization in hermaphrodites or through hermaphrodites breeding with males. Males are produced through non-disjunction of the X chromosomes during meiosis. The worms that reproduce through self-fertilization are at risk for high linkage disequilibrium, which leads to lower genetic diversity in populations and an increase in accumulation of deleterious alleles. In C. elegans, somatic sex determination is attributed to the tra-1 gene. The tra-1 is a gene within the TRA-1 transcription factor sex determination pathway that is regulated post-transcriptionally and works by promoting female development. In hermaphrodites (XX), there are high levels of tra-1 activity, which produces the female reproductive system and inhibits male development. At a certain time in their life cycle, one day before adulthood, hermaphrodites can be identified through the addition of a vulva near their tail. In males (XO), there are low levels of tra-1 activity, resulting in a male reproductive system. Recent research has shown that there are three other genes, fem-1, fem-2, and fem-3, that negatively regulate the TRA-1 pathway and act as the final determiner of sex in C. elegans.

==== Evolution ====
The sex determination system in C. elegans is a topic that has been of interest to scientists for years. Since they are used as a model organism, any information discovered about the way their sex determination system might have evolved could further the same evolutionary biology research in other organisms. After almost 30 years of research, scientists have begun to put together the pieces in the evolution of such a system. What they have discovered is that there is a complex pathway involved that has several layers of regulation. The closely related organism Caenorhabditis briggsae has been studied extensively and its whole genome sequence has helped put together the missing pieces in the evolution of C. elegans sex determination. It has been discovered that two genes have assimilated, leading to the proteins XOL-1 and MIX-1 having an effect on sex determination in C. elegans as well. Mutations in the XOL-1 pathway leads to feminization in C. elegans . The mix-1 gene is known to hypoactivate the X chromosome and regulates the morphology of the male tail in C. elegans. Looking at the nematode as a whole, the male and hermaphrodite sex likely evolved from parallel evolution. Parallel evolution is defined as similar traits evolving from an ancestor in similar conditions; simply put, the two species evolve in similar ways over time. An example of this would be marsupial and placental mammals. Scientists have also hypothesized that hermaphrodite asexual reproduction, or "selfing", could have evolved convergently by studying species similar to C. elegans Other studies on the sex determination evolution suggest that genes involving sperm evolve at the faster rate than female genes. However, sperm genes on the X chromosome have reduced evolution rates. Sperm genes have short coding sequences, high codon bias, and disproportionate representation among orphan genes. These characteristics of sperm genes may be the reason for their high rates of evolution and may also suggest how sperm genes evolved out of hermaphrodite worms. Overall, scientists have a general idea of the sex determination pathway in C. elegans, however, the evolution of how this pathway came to be is not yet well defined.

== Development ==
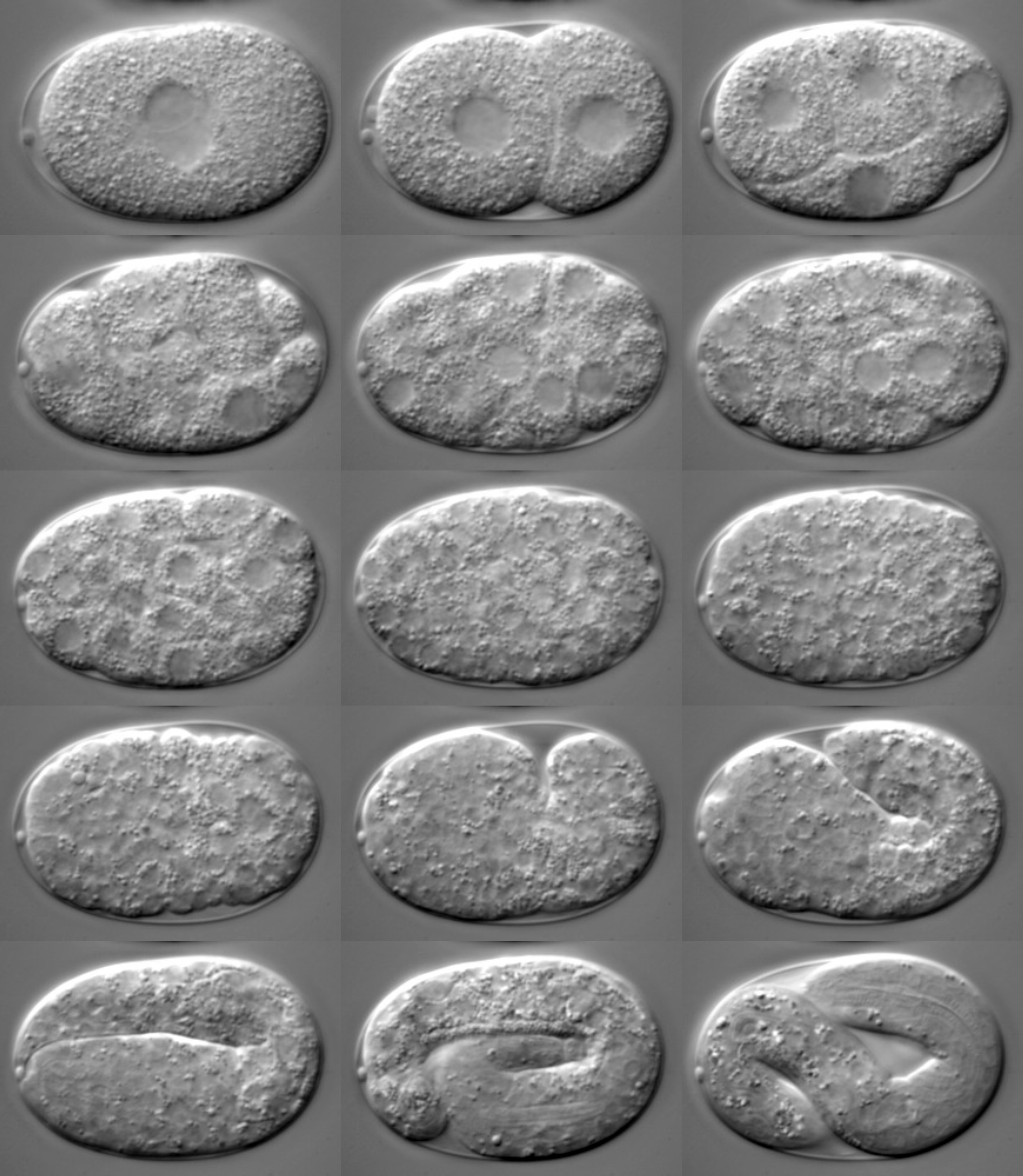
C. elegans embryonic development

=== Embryonic development ===
The fertilized zygote undergoes rotational holoblastic cleavage.

Sperm entry into the oocyte commences formation of an anterior-posterior axis. The sperm microtubule organizing center directs the movement of the sperm pronucleus to the future posterior pole of the embryo, while also inciting the movement of PAR proteins, a group of cytoplasmic determination factors, to their proper respective locations. As a result of the difference in PAR protein distribution, the first cell division is highly asymmetric. C. elegans embryogenesis is among the best understood examples of asymmetric cell division.

All cells of the germline arise from a single primordial germ cell, called the P4 cell, established early in embryogenesis. This primordial cell divides to generate two germline precursors that do not divide further until after hatching.

==== Axis formation ====
The resulting daughter cells of the first cell division are called the AB cell (containing PAR-6 and PAR-3) and the P1 cell (containing PAR-1 and PAR-2). A second cell division produces the ABp and ABa cells from the AB cell, and the EMS and P2 cells from the P1 cell. This division establishes the dorsal-ventral axis, with the ABp cell forming the dorsal side and the EMS cell marking the ventral side. Through Wnt signaling, the P2 cell instructs the EMS cell to divide along the anterior-posterior axis. Through Notch signaling, the P2 cell differentially specifies the ABp and ABa cells, which further defines the dorsal-ventral axis. The left-right axis also becomes apparent early in embryogenesis, although it is unclear exactly when specifically the axis is determined. However, most theories of the L-R axis development involve some kind of differences in cells derived from the AB cell.

==== Gastrulation ====
Gastrulation occurs after the embryo reaches the 24-cell stage. C. elegans are a species of protostomes, so the blastopore eventually forms the mouth. Involution into the blastopore begins with movement of the endoderm cells and subsequent formation of the gut, followed by the P4 germline precursor, and finally the mesoderm cells, including the cells that eventually form the pharynx. Gastrulation ends when epiboly of the hypoblasts closes the blastopore.

=== Post-embryonic development ===
Anatomy and scale of C. elegans developmental stages

Life cycle and developmental stages of C. elegans

Under environmental conditions favourable for reproduction, hatched larvae develop through four larval stages - L1, L2, L3, and L4 - in just 3 days at 20 °C. When conditions are stressed, as in food insufficiency, excessive population density or high temperature, C. elegans can enter an alternative third larval stage, L2d, called the dauer stage (Dauer is German for permanent). A specific dauer pheromone regulates entry into the dauer state. This pheromone is composed of similar derivatives of the 3,6-dideoxy sugar, ascarylose. Ascarosides, named after the ascarylose base, are involved in many sex-specific and social behaviors. In this way, they constitute a chemical language that C. elegans uses to modulate various phenotypes. Dauer larvae are stress-resistant; they are thin and their mouths are sealed with a characteristic dauer cuticle and cannot take in food. They can remain in this stage for a few months. The stage ends when conditions improve favour further growth of the larva, now moulting into the L4 stage, even though the gonad development is arrested at the L2 stage.

Each stage transition is punctuated by a molt of the worm's transparent cuticle. Transitions through these stages are controlled by genes of the heterochronic pathway, an evolutionarily conserved set of regulatory factors. Many heterochronic genes code for microRNAs, which repress the expression of heterochronic transcription factors and other heterochronic miRNAs. miRNAs were originally discovered in C. elegans. Important developmental events controlled by heterochronic genes include the division and eventual syncitial fusion of the hypodermic seam cells, and their subsequent secretion of the alae in young adults. It is believed that the heterochronic pathway represents an evolutionarily conserved predecessor to circadian clocks.

Some nematodes have a fixed, genetically determined number of cells, a phenomenon known as eutely. The adult C. elegans hermaphrodite has 959 somatic cells and the male has 1033 cells, although it has been suggested that the number of their intestinal cells can increase by one to three in response to gut microbes experienced by mothers. Much of the literature describes the cell number in males as 1031, but the discovery of a pair of left and right MCM neurons increased the number by two in 2015. The number of cells does not change after cell division ceases at the end of the larval period, and subsequent growth is due solely to an increase in the size of individual cells.

== Ecology ==
The different Caenorhabditis species occupy various nutrient- and bacteria-rich environments. They feed on the bacteria that develop in decaying organic matter (microbivory). They possess chemosensory receptors which enable the detection of bacteria and bacterial-secreted metabolites (such as iron siderophores), so that they can migrate towards their bacterial prey. Soil lacks enough organic matter to support self-sustaining populations. C. elegans can survive on a diet of a variety of bacteria, but its wild ecology is largely unknown. Most laboratory strains were taken from artificial environments such as gardens and compost piles. More recently, C. elegans has been found to thrive in other kinds of organic matter, particularly rotting fruit. C. elegans can also ingest pollutants, especially tiny nanoplastics, which could enable the association with antibiotic-resistant bacteria, resulting in the dissemination of nanoplastics and antibiotic-resistant bacteria by C. elegans across the soil. Moreover, microplastics can alter the bacterial food preference by C. elegans over generations, resulting in C. elegans preferring microplastic-contaminated food over non-contaminated bacteria.

C. elegans can also use different species of yeast, including Cryptococcus laurentii and C. kuetzingii, as sole sources of food. Although a bacterivore, C. elegans can be killed by a number of pathogenic bacteria, including human pathogens such as Staphylococcus aureus, Pseudomonas aeruginosa, Salmonella enterica or Enterococcus faecalis. Pathogenic bacteria can also form biofilms, whose sticky exopolymer matrix could impede C. elegans motility and cloaks bacterial quorum sensing chemoattractants from predator detection.

Invertebrates such as millipedes, insects, isopods, and gastropods can transport dauer larvae to various suitable locations. The larvae have also been seen to feed on their hosts when they die.
Nematodes can survive desiccation, and in C. elegans, the mechanism for this capability has been demonstrated to be late embryogenesis abundant proteins.
C. elegans, as other nematodes, can be eaten by predator nematodes and other omnivores, including some insects.

The Orsay virus is a virus that affects C. elegans, as well as the Caenorhabditis elegans Cer1 virus and the Caenorhabditis elegans Cer13 virus.

Interactions with fungi

Wild isolates of Caenorhabditis elegans are regularly found with infections by Microsporidia fungi. One such species, Nematocida parisii, replicates in the intestines of C. elegans.

Arthrobotrys oligospora is the model organism for interactions between fungi and nematodes. It is the most common and widespread nematode capturing fungus.

== Use as a model organism ==
Asymmetric cell divisions during early embryogenesis of wild-type C. elegans

In 1963, Sydney Brenner proposed using C. elegans as a model organism for the investigation primarily of neural development in animals. It is one of the simplest organisms with a nervous system. The neurons do not fire action potentials, and do not express any voltage-gated sodium channels. In the hermaphrodite, this system comprises 302 neurons the pattern of which has been comprehensively mapped, in what is known as a connectome, and shown to be a small-world network.

Research has explored the neural and molecular mechanisms that control several behaviors of C. elegans, including chemotaxis, thermotaxis, mechanotransduction, learning, memory, and mating behaviour. In 2019 the connectome of the male was published using a technique distinct from that used for the hermaphrodite. The same paper used the new technique to redo the hermaphrodite connectome, finding 1,500 new synapses.

It has been used as a model organism to study molecular mechanisms in metabolic diseases. Brenner also chose it as it is easy to grow in bulk populations, and convenient for genetic analysis. It is a multicellular eukaryotic organism, yet simple enough to be studied in great detail. The transparency of C. elegans facilitates the study of cellular differentiation and other developmental processes in the intact organism. The spicules in the male clearly distinguish males from females. Strains are cheap to breed and can be frozen. When subsequently thawed, they remain viable, allowing long-term storage. Maintenance is easy when compared to other multicellular model organisms. A few hundred nematodes can be kept on a single agar plate and suitable growth medium. Brenner described the use of a mutant of E. coli – OP50. OP50 is a uracil-requiring organism and its deficiency in the plate prevents the overgrowth of bacteria which would obscure the worms. The use of OP50 does not demand any major laboratory safety measures, since it is non-pathogenic and easily grown in Luria-Bertani (LB) media overnight.

=== Cell lineage mapping ===
The developmental fate of every single somatic cell (959 in the adult hermaphrodite; 1031 in the adult male) has been mapped. These patterns of cell lineage are largely invariant between individuals, whereas in mammals, cell development is more dependent on cellular cues from the embryo.

As mentioned previously, the first cell divisions of early embryogenesis in C. elegans are among the best understood examples of asymmetric cell divisions, and the worm is a very popular model system for studying developmental biology.

=== Programmed cell death ===
Programmed cell death (apoptosis) eliminates many additional cells (131 in the hermaphrodite, most of which would otherwise become neurons); this "apoptotic predictability" has contributed to the elucidation of some apoptotic genes. Cell death-promoting genes and a single cell-death inhibitor have been identified.

=== RNA interference and gene silencing ===
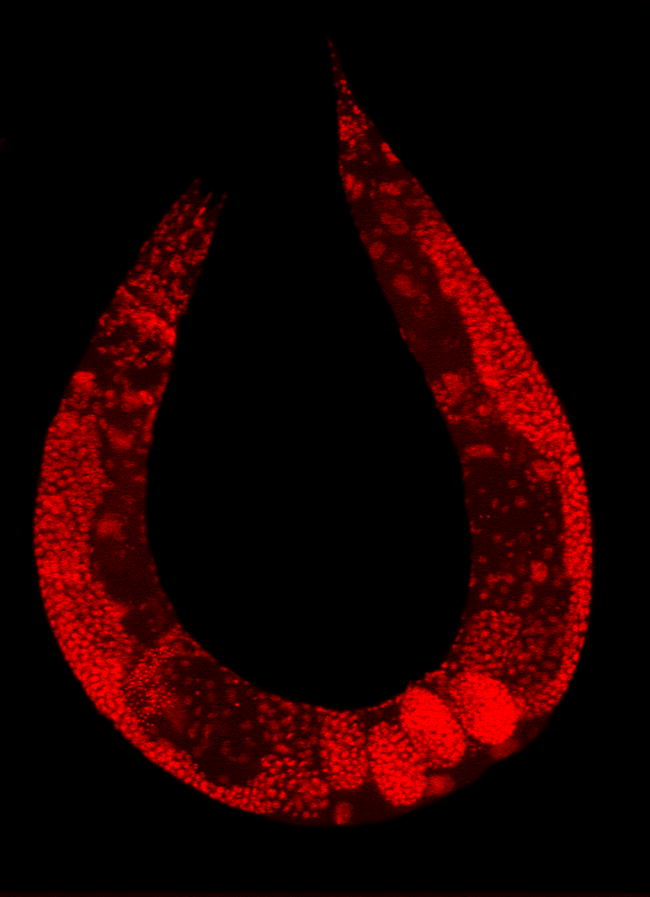
Wild-type C. elegans hermaphrodite stained with the fluorescent dye Texas Red to highlight the nuclei of all cells

RNA interference (RNAi) is a relatively straightforward method of disrupting the function of specific genes. By introducing dsRNA into cells, homologous mRNA is degraded, silencing the function of the associated gene. Selective disruption of a single gene can allow a researchers to infer its possible function. The nematode can be soaked in, injected with, or fed with genetically transformed bacteria that express the double-stranded RNA of interest, the sequence of which complements the sequence of the gene that the researcher wishes to disable. RNAi has emerged as a powerful tool in the study of functional genomics. C. elegans has been used to analyse gene functions and claim the promise of future findings in the systematic genetic interactions.

Environmental RNAi uptake is much worse in other species of worms in the genus Caenorhabditis. Although injecting RNA into the body cavity of the animal induces gene silencing in most species, only C. elegans and a few other distantly related nematodes can take up RNA from the bacteria they eat for RNAi. This ability has been mapped down to a single gene, sid-2, which, when inserted as a transgene in other species, allows them to take up RNA for RNAi as C. elegans does.

=== Cell division and cell cycle ===
Research into meiosis has been considerably simplified since every germ cell nucleus is at the same given position as it moves down the gonad, so is at the same stage in meiosis. In an early phase of meiosis, the oocytes become extremely resistant to radiation and this resistance depends on expression of genes rad51 and atm that have key roles in recombinational repair. Gene mre-11 also plays a crucial role in recombinational repair of DNA damage during meiosis. Furthermore, during meiosis in C. elegans the tumor suppressor BRCA1/BRC-1 and the structural maintenance of chromosomes SMC5/SMC6 protein complex interact to promote high fidelity repair of DNA double-strand breaks.

A study of the frequency of outcrossing in natural populations showed that selfing is the predominant mode of reproduction in C. elegans, but that infrequent outcrossing events occur at a rate around 1%. Meioses that result in selfing are unlikely to contribute significantly to beneficial genetic variability, but these meioses may provide the adaptive benefit of recombinational repair of DNA damages that arise, especially under stressful conditions.

=== Drug abuse and addiction ===
Nicotine dependence can also be studied using C. elegans because it exhibits behavioral responses to nicotine that parallel those of mammals. These responses include acute response, tolerance, withdrawal, and sensitization.

=== Biological databases ===
As for most model organisms, scientists that work in the field curate a dedicated online database and WormBase is that for C. elegans. The WormBase attempts to collate all published information on C. elegans and other related nematodes. Information on C. elegans is included with data on other model organisms in the Alliance of Genome Resources.

=== Ageing ===
C. elegans has been a model organism for research into ageing; for example, the inhibition of an insulin-like growth factor signaling pathway has been shown to increase adult lifespan threefold; while glucose feeding promotes oxidative stress and reduces adult lifespan by a half. Similarly, induced degradation of an insulin/IGF-1 receptor late in life extended life expectancy of worms dramatically. Long-lived mutants of C. elegans were demonstrated to be resistant to oxidative stress and UV light. These long-lived mutants had a higher DNA repair capability than wild-type C. elegans. Knockdown of the nucleotide excision repair gene Xpa-1 increased sensitivity to UV and reduced the life span of the long-lived mutants. These findings indicate that DNA repair capability underlies longevity. Consistent with the idea that oxidative DNA damage causes aging, it was found that in C. elegans, exosome-mediated delivery of superoxide dismutase (SOD) reduces the level of reactive oxygen species (ROS) and significantly extends lifespan, i.e. delays aging under normal, as well as hostile conditions.

The capacity to repair DNA damage by the process of nucleotide excision repair declines with age.

C. elegans exposed to 5mM lithium chloride (LiCl) showed lengthened life spans. When exposed to 10μM LiCl, reduced mortality was observed, but not with 1μM.

C. elegans has been instrumental in the identification of the functions of genes implicated in Alzheimer's disease, such as presenilin. Moreover, extensive research on C. elegans has identified RNA-binding proteins as essential factors during germline and early embryonic development.

Telomeres, the length of which have been shown to correlate with increased lifespan and delayed onset of senescence in a multitude of organisms, from C. elegans to humans, show an interesting behaviour in C. elegans. While C. elegans maintains its telomeres in a canonical way similar to other eukaryotes, in contrast Drosophila melanogaster is noteworthy in its use of retrotransposons to maintain its telomeres, during knock-out of the catalytic subunit of the telomerase (trt-1) C. elegans can gain the ability of alternative telomere lengthening (ALT). C. elegans was the first eukaryote to gain ALT functionality after knock-out of the canonical telomerase pathway. ALT is also observed in about 10-15% of all clinical cancers. Thus C. elegans is a prime candidate for ALT research. Bayat et al. showed the paradoxical shortening of telomeres during trt-1 over-expression which lead to near sterility while the worms even exhibited a slight increase in lifespan, despite shortened telomeres.

=== Sleep ===
C. elegans is notable in animal sleep studies as the most primitive organism to display sleep-like states. In C. elegans, a lethargus phase occurs shortly before each moult. C. elegans has also been demonstrated to sleep after exposure to physical stress, including heat shock, UV radiation, and bacterial toxins.

=== Sensory biology ===
While the worm has no eyes, it has been found to be sensitive to light due to a third type of light-sensitive animal photoreceptor protein, LITE-1, which is 10 to 100 times more efficient at absorbing light than the other two types of photopigments (opsins and cryptochromes) found in the animal kingdom.

C. elegans is remarkably adept at tolerating acceleration. It can withstand 400,000 g's, according to geneticists at the University of São Paulo in Brazil. In an experiment, 96% of them were still alive without adverse effects after an hour in an ultracentrifuge.

=== Drug library screening ===
Having a small size and short life cycle, C. elegans is one of the few organisms that can enable in vivo high throughput screening (HTS) platforms for the evaluation of chemical libraries of drugs and toxins in a multicellular organism. Orthologous phenotypes observable in C. elegans for human diseases have the potential to enable profiling of drug library profiling that can inform potential repurposing of existing approved drugs for therapeutic indications in humans.

=== Spaceflight research ===
C. elegans made news when specimens were discovered to have survived the Space Shuttle Columbia disaster in February 2003. Later, in January 2009, live samples of C. elegans from the University of Nottingham were announced to be spending two weeks on the International Space Station that October, in a space research project to explore the effects of zero gravity on muscle development and physiology. The research was primarily about genetic basis of muscle atrophy, which relates to spaceflight or being bed-ridden, geriatric, or diabetic. Descendants of the worms aboard Columbia in 2003 were launched into space on Endeavour for the STS-134 mission. Additional experiments on muscle dystrophy during spaceflight were carried on board the ISS starting in 2018. It was shown that the genes affecting muscles attachment were expressed less in space. However, it has yet to be seen if this affects muscle strength.

=== Social behavior ===
In 2017, a study of oxytocin-dependent social interactions between larvae and adult C. elegans found that before food sources become limited, parents recognize their offspring. Parents will then proceed to exhibit food-leaving behavior for the benefit of their offspring. Since this behavior depends on nematocin, an ancient nematode version of oxytocin (colloquially referred to as the "love hormone"), researchers have recognized C. elegans as evidence of 'caring' behavior in nematodes.

== Genetics ==
=== Genome ===
Genomic information
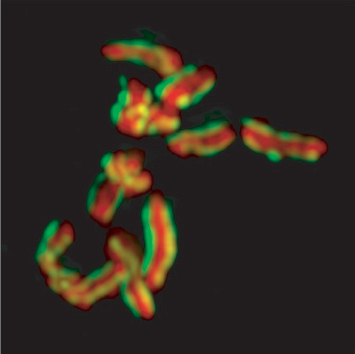
- Karyotype of C. elegans explanation of colors Mitotic chromosomes of C. elegans. DNA (red)/ Kinetochores (green). Holocentric organisms, including C. elegans, assemble diffuse kinetochores along the entire poleward face of each sister chromatid.
- NCBI ID: GCA_000002985.3
- Ploidy: diploid
- Genome size: 101.169 Mb (haploid)
- Number of chromosomes: 5 pairs of autosomes (I, II, III, IV and V) + 1 or 2 sex chromosomes (X)
- Year of completion: 1998
- Sequenced organelle: mitochondrion
- Organelle size: 0,01 Mb
- UCSC Genome Browser assembly ID: ce11

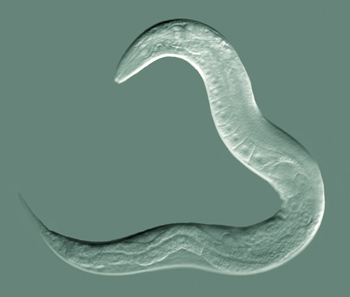
C. elegans hermaphrodite

C. elegans was the first multicellular organism to have its whole genome sequenced. The sequence was published in 1998, although some small gaps were present; the last gap was finished by October 2002. In the run up to the whole genome the C. elegans Sequencing Consortium/C. elegans Genome Project released several partial scans including Wilson et al. 1994.

==== Size and gene content ====
The C. elegans genome is about 100 million base pairs long and consists of six pairs of chromosomes in hermaphrodites or five pairs of autosomes with XO chromosome in male C. elegans and a mitochondrial genome. Its gene density is about one gene per five kilo-base pairs. Introns make up 26% and intergenic regions 47% of the genome. Many genes are arranged in clusters and how many of these are operons is unclear. C. elegans and other nematodes are among the few eukaryotes currently known to have operons; these include trypanosomes, flatworms (notably the trematode Schistosoma mansoni), and a primitive chordate tunicate Oikopleura dioica. Many more organisms are likely to be shown to have these operons.

The genome contains an estimated 20,470 protein-coding genes. About 35% of C. elegans genes have human homologs. Remarkably, human genes have been shown repeatedly to replace their C. elegans homologs when introduced into C. elegans. Conversely, many C. elegans genes can function similarly to mammalian genes.

The number of known RNA genes in the genome has increased greatly due to the 2006 discovery of a new class called 21U-RNA genes, and the genome is now believed to contain more than 16,000 RNA genes, up from as few as 1,300 in 2005.

Scientific curators continue to appraise the set of known genes; new gene models continue to be added and incorrect ones modified or removed.

The reference C. elegans genome sequence continues to change as new evidence reveals errors in the original sequencing. Most changes are minor, adding or removing only a few base pairs of DNA. For example, the WS202 release of WormBase (April 2009) added two base pairs to the genome sequence. Sometimes, more extensive changes are made as noted in the WS197 release of December 2008, which added a region of over 4,300 bp to the sequence.

The C. elegans Genome Project's Wilson et al. 1994 found CelVav and a von Willebrand factor A domain and with Wilson et al. 1998 provides the first credible evidence for an aryl hydrocarbon receptor (AHR) homolog outside of vertebrates.

==== Related genomes ====
In 2003, the genome sequence of the related nematode C. briggsae was also determined, allowing researchers to study the comparative genomics of these two organisms. The genome sequences of more nematodes from the same genus e.g., C. remanei, C. japonica and C. brenneri (named after Brenner), have also been studied using the shotgun sequencing technique. These sequences have now been completed.

=== Other genetic studies ===
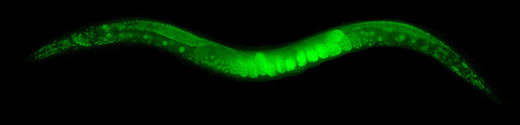
C. elegans adult with GFP coding sequence inserted into a histone-encoding gene by Cas9-triggered homologous recombination

As of 2014, C. elegans is the sister to all other species in the 'Elegans' group (10 species) of the 'Elegans' supergroup (17 species) in phylogenetic studies. It forms a branch of its own distinct to any other species of the group.

Tc1 transposon is a DNA transposon active in C. elegans.

== Scientific community ==
Several scientists have won the Nobel Prize in Physiology or Medicine for scientific discoveries made working with C. elegans. It was awarded in 2002 to Sydney Brenner, H. Robert Horvitz, and John Sulston for their work on the genetics of organ development and programmed cell death, in 2006 to Andrew Fire and Craig C. Mello for their discovery of RNA interference, and in 2024 to Victor Ambros and Gary Ruvkun for their discovery of microRNA and its role in gene regulation. In 2008, Martin Chalfie shared a Nobel Prize in Chemistry for his work on green fluorescent protein; some of the research involved the use of C. elegans.

Many scientists who research C. elegans closely connect to Sydney Brenner, with whom almost all research in this field began in the 1970s; they have worked as either a postdoctoral or a postgraduate researcher in Brenner's lab or in the lab of someone who previously worked with Brenner. Most who worked in his lab later established their own worm research labs, thereby creating a fairly well-documented "lineage" of C. elegans scientists, which was recorded into the WormBase database in some detail at the 2003 International Worm Meeting.

== See also ==
- Animal testing on invertebrates
- Bioluminescence
- Eileen Southgate
- Intronerator
- OpenWorm
- WormBook
