= Trans-Spliced Exon Coupled RNA End Determination =

Trans-Spliced Exon Coupled RNA End Determination (TEC-RED) is a transcriptomic technique that, like SAGE, allows for the digital detection of messenger RNA sequences. Unlike SAGE, detection and purification of transcripts from the 5’ end of the messenger RNA require the presence of a trans-spliced leader sequence.

== Trans-splicing Background ==
Spliced leader sequences are short sequences of non coding RNA, not found within a gene itself, that are attached to the 5’ end of all, or a portion of, mRNAs transcribed in an organism. They have been found in several species to be responsible for separating polycistronic transcripts into single gene mRNAs, and in others to splice onto monocistronic transcripts. The major role of trans-splicing on monocistronic transcripts is largely unknown. It has been proposed that they may act as an independent promoter that aids in tissue specific expression of independent protein isoforms. Spliced leaders have been seen in trypanosomatids, Euglena, flatworms, Caenorhabditis. Some species contain only one spliced leader sequence found on all mRNAs. In C. elegans two are seen and are labeled SL1 and SL2.

== TEC-RED Methods ==
TEC RED Protocol for attaining RNA signal

Total RNA is purified from the specimen of interest. Poly A messenger RNA is then purified from total RNA and subsequently translated into cDNA using a reverse transcription reaction. The cDNA produced from the mRNA is labeled using primers homologous to the spliced leader sequences of the organism. In a nine step PCR reaction the cDNAs are concurrently embedded with the BpmI restriction endonuclease site (though any class IIs restriction endonuclease may work) and a biotin label which are present in the primers. These tagged cDNAs are then cleaved 14 bp downstream from the recognition site using BpmI restriction endonuclease and blunt ended with T4 DNA polymerase. The fragments are further purified away from extraneous DNA material by using the biotin labels to bind them to a streptavidin matrix. They are then ligated to adapter DNA, in six separate reactions, containing six different restriction endonuclease recognition sites. These tags are then amplified by PCR with primers containing a mismatch changing the Bpm1 site to a Xho1 site. The amplicons are concatenated and ligated into a plasmid vector. The clonal vectors are then sequenced and mapped to the genome.

== Concatenation ==
Concatenation differences between TEC RED and SAGE

Concatenation of the tags, as developed in 2004, is different from that seen in SAGE. The cleavage of the tags with Xho1 and mixture of the different samples, followed by ligation, form the first concatenation step. The second step uses one of the restriction endonucleases with consensus to the adapter molecule attached to the 3’ end. They are again ligated, and PCR is performed to purify samples for the next joining. The concatenation is continued with the second restriction endonuclease, followed by the third and finally the fourth. This results in the concatamer formed by the six endonuclease ligations containing 32 tags, arranged 5’ to 5’ around the Xho1 site. In SAGE, concatenation takes place after ditags are formed and amplified by PCR. The linkers on the outside of the ditags are cleaved with the enzyme that provided their binding and these sticky end ditags are concatenated randomly and placed into a cloning vector.

== Advantages ==
The advantage of TEC-RED over SAGE is that no restriction endonuclease is needed for the initial linker binding. This prevents bias associated with restriction site sequences that will be missing from some genes, as is seen in SAGE. The ability to have a snapshot of specific RNA isoforms allows the deduction of differential regulation of isoforms through alternative selection of promoters. This may also aid in the discernment of expression patterns unique to the SL1 or SL2 sequence. TEC-RED also allows characterization of the 5’ ends of RNA produced and therefore of isoforms that differ by the amino terminal splicing. The technology permits the determination and verification of all known and unknown genes that may be predicted as well as the 5’ splice isoforms or 5’ RNA ends that may be produced. Using TEC-RED in conjunction with SAGE or a modified protocol will allow discernment of the 5’ and 3’ ends of transcripts, respectively. The identification of alternative splice variants, and possibly the relative quantities, containing a trans-spliced leader sequence is therefore possible.

== Variations ==
Two alternate techniques have been described that allow for 5’ tag analysis in organisms that do not have trans-spliced leader sequences. The techniques presented by Toshiyuki et al. and Shin-ichi et al. are called CAGE and 5’ SAGE respectively. CAGE utilizes biotinylated cap-trapper technology to maintain mRNA signal long enough to create and select full length cDNAs, which have adapter sequences ligated on the 5‘ end. 5’ SAGE utilizes oligo-capping technology. Both use their adapter sequence to prime from after the cDNA is created. Both of these methods have disadvantages though. CAGE has shown tags with addition of a guanine on the first position and oligo-capping may lead to sequence bias due to the use of RNA ligase.

== See also ==
- RNA-seq
- DNA microarray
