= Parastrachia =

Scientific classification
- Kingdom: Animalia
- Phylum: Arthropoda
- Clade: Pancrustacea
- Class: Insecta
- Order: Hemiptera
- Suborder: Heteroptera
- Family: Parastrachiidae
- Genus: Parastrachia; Distant, 1883

Species
- Parastrachia japonensis (Scott, 1880); Parastrachia nagaensis Distant, 1908

Genus of true bugs

Parastrachia is a genus of true bugs belonging to the family Parastrachiidae. It was established in 1883 by the English entomologist William Lucas Distant. It consists of only two species from Eastern Asia, Parastrachia japonensis and Parastrachia nagaensis. Like some other members of the superfamily Pentatomoidea, they exhibit maternal care of eggs.
