= Caenorhabditis elegans Cer13 virus =

Virus classification
- (unranked): Virus
- Realm: Riboviria
- Kingdom: Pararnavirae
- Phylum: Artverviricota
- Class: Revtraviricetes
- Order: Ortervirales
- Family: Belpaoviridae
- Genus: Semotivirus
- Species: Caenorhabditis elegans Cer13 virus

Species of virus

Caenorhabditis elegans Cer13 virus is a species of virus in the genus Semotivirus and the family Belpaoviridae. It exists as retrotransposons in the Caenorhabditis elegans genome.
