= 21U-RNA =

21U-RNAs are microRNA molecules 21 nucleotides long found in nematodes such as Caenorhabditis elegans. They begin with a 5' uridine. The remaining 20 nucleotides are diverse. They are modified at their 3′-terminal ribose. See Piwi-interacting RNA.
