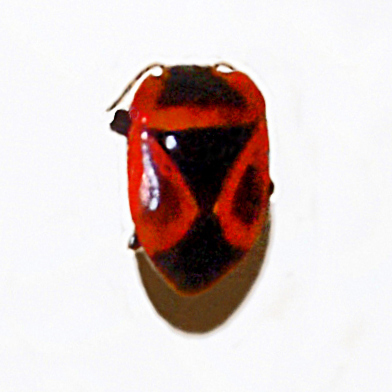
- Dismegistus costalis

Scientific classification
- Domain: Eukaryota
- Kingdom: Animalia
- Phylum: Arthropoda
- Class: Insecta
- Order: Hemiptera
- Suborder: Heteroptera
- Family: Parastrachiidae
- Genus: Dismegistus; Amyot & Serville, 1843

= Dismegistus =

Genus of true bugs

Dismegistus is a genus of true bugs belonging to the family Parastrachiidae.

== Species ==
Species in the genus include:

- Dismegistus binotatus (Westw.)
- Dismegistus circumcinctus (Hahn)
- Dismegistus costalis Reiche & Fairmaire in Ferret & Galinier 1850
- Dismegistus fimbriatus Thunb.
- Dismegistus funebris
- Dismegistus rufomarginatus Hesse 1925
