= Fanconi anemia group F protein =

Protein-coding gene in the species Homo sapiens

FANCF
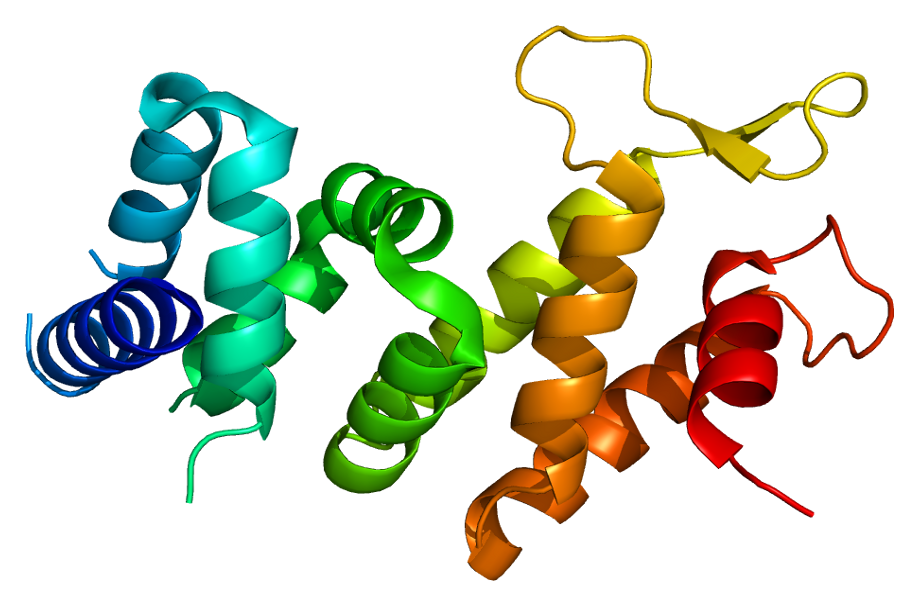

Identifiers
- Aliases: FANCF, FAF, Fanconi anemia complementation group F, FA complementation group F
- External IDs: OMIM: 613897; MGI: 3689889; GeneCards: FANCF
Available structures
PDB	Ortholog search: PDBe RCSB
PDB	List of PDB id codes 2IQC

Gene location (Human)
Chr.	Chromosome 11 (human)
Band	11p14.3	Start	22,622,533 bp
Band	11p14.3	End	22,625,823 bp

Gene location (Mouse)
Chr.	Chromosome 7 (mouse)
Band	7|7 B4	Start	51,510,325 bp
Band	7|7 B4	End	51,512,015 bp
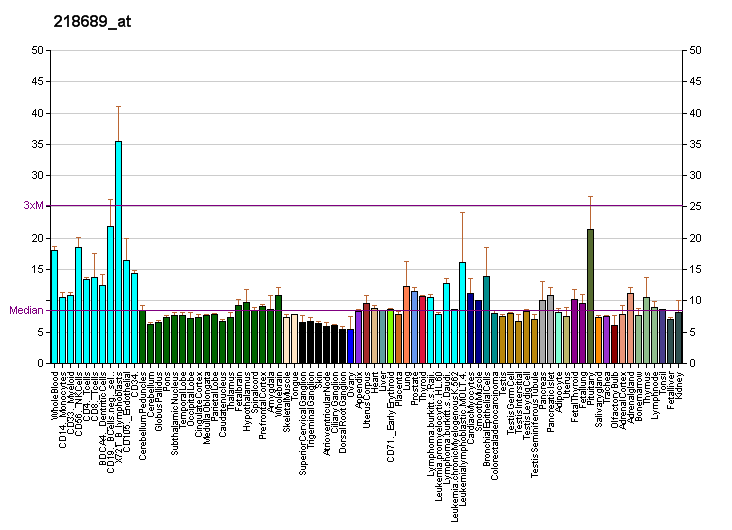
RNA expression pattern
Bgee	Human / Mouse (ortholog); Top expressed in: secondary oocyte; endothelial cell; bronchial epithelial cell; ganglionic eminence; corpus epididymis; Epithelium of choroid plexus; caput epididymis; hair follicle; islet of Langerhans; ventricular zone / Top expressed in: trigeminal ganglion; condyle; fossa; Paneth cell; renal corpuscle; barrel cortex; substantia nigra; motor neuron; medullary collecting duct; internal carotid artery; More reference expression data
BioGPS	More reference expression data
Gene ontology
Molecular function	protein binding; molecular function; ubiquitin protein ligase activity
Cellular component	Fanconi anaemia nuclear complex; nucleus; nucleoplasm
Biological process	interstrand cross-link repair; cellular response to DNA damage stimulus; DNA repair; biological process; ovarian follicle development; spermatogenesis; protein ubiquitination
Sources:Amigo / QuickGO
Orthologs
Databases	NCBI: entry; OMA: entry
Species	Human	Mouse
Entrez	2188	100040608
Ensembl	ENSG00000183161	ENSMUSG00000092118
UniProt	Q9NPI8	E9Q5Z5
RefSeq (mRNA)	NM_022725	NM_001115087
RefSeq (protein)	NP_073562	NP_001108559
Location (UCSC)	Chr 11: 22.62 – 22.63 Mb	Chr 7: 51.51 – 51.51 Mb
PubMed search
- Wikidata
View/Edit Human	View/Edit Mouse

Fanconi anemia group F protein is a protein that in humans is encoded by the FANCF gene.

== Interactions ==
FANCF has been shown to interact with Fanconi anemia, complementation group C, FANCG, FANCA and FANCE.

== Function ==
FANCF is an adaptor protein that plays a key role in the proper assembly of the FA core complex. The FA core complex is composed of eight proteins (FANCA, -B, -C, -E, -F, -G, -L and -M). FANCF stabilizes the interaction between the FANCC/FANCE subcomplex and the FANCA/FANCG subcomplex and locks the whole FA core complex in a conformation that is essential to perform its function in DNA repair.

The FA core complex is a nuclear core complex that is essential for the monoubiquitination of FANCD2 and this modified form of FANCD2 colocalizes with BRCA1, RAD51 and PCNA in foci that also contain other DNA repair proteins. All these proteins function together to facilitate DNA interstrand cross-link repair. They also function in other DNA damage response repair processes including recovering and stabilizing stalled replication forks. FoxF1 protein also interacts with the FA protein core and induces its binding to chromatin to promote DNA repair.

== Cancer ==
DNA damage appears to be the primary underlying cause of cancer, and deficiencies in expression of DNA repair genes appear to underlie many forms of cancer. If DNA repair is deficient, DNA damage tends to accumulate. Such excess DNA damage may increase mutations due to error-prone translesion synthesis. Excess DNA damage may also increase epigenetic alterations due to errors during DNA repair. Such mutations and epigenetic alterations may give rise to cancer.

Reductions in expression of DNA repair genes (usually caused by epigenetic alterations) are very common in cancers, and are most often much more frequent than mutational defects in DNA repair genes in cancers. (Also see Frequencies of epimutations in DNA repair genes.)

Methylation of the promoter region of the FANCF gene causes reduced expression of FANCF protein.

The frequencies of FANCF promoter methylation in several different cancers is indicated in the table.

Frequency of FANCF promoter methylation in sporadic cancers
Cancer	Frequency	Ref.
Epithelian ovarian cancer	32%	
Cervical carcinoma	30%	
Ovarian cancer	21%-28%	
Head and neck squamous carcinomas	15%	
Non-small cell lung cancer	14%	
Male germ cell tumor	6%	

In invasive breast cancers, microRNA-210 (miR-210) was increased, along with decreased expression of FANCF, where FANCF was one of the likely targets of miR-210.

Although mutations in FANCF are ordinarily not observed in human tumors, an FANCF-deficient mouse model was prone to ovarian cancers.

FANCF appears to be one of about 26 DNA repair genes that are epigenetically repressed in various cancers (see Cancer epigenetics).

== Infertility ==
The gonads of FANCF mutant mice function abnormally, having compromised follicle development and spermatogenesis as has been observed in other Fanconi anemia mouse models and in Fanconi anemia patients. Histological examination of the testes from FANCF-deficient mice showed that the seminiferous tubules were devoid of germ cells. At 14 weeks of age, FANCF-deficient female mice were almost or completely devoid of primordial follicles. It was concluded that FANCF-deficient mice display a rapid depletion of primordial follicles at a young age resulting in advanced ovarian aging.
