= Orsay virus =

Virus classification
- (unranked): Virus
- Realm: Riboviria
- Kingdom: Orthornavirae
- Phylum: Kitrinoviricota
- Class: Magsaviricetes
- Order: Nodamuvirales
- Family: Nodaviridae
- Virus: Orsay virus

Species of virus

Orsay virus is a positive-sense single-stranded RNA virus that infects Caenorhabditis elegans nematode. It resembles nodaviruses (family Nodaviridae), but has yet to be formally classified.

Orsay virus has a (+)ssRNA genome consisting of two segments, termed RNA1 and RNA2. The RNA1 segment encodes an RNA-dependent RNA polymerase (RdRP) of 982 amino acids. The RNA2 segment has two open reading frames (ORFs) that code for a capsid protein and a non-structural protein with unknown function. The virus is composed of two structural domains, a shell (S) and a protrusion (P) domain.

Orsay virus was discovered in 2011 in Caenorhabditis elegans nematodes in rotting fruit in Orsay, France. Just before the time of the discovery, standardized methods were developed for the wild isolation of nematodes. Using these methods, Caenorhabditis briggsae and C. elegans nematodes were found that displayed abnormalities in the intestines, such as extensive convolutions of the apical intestinal border. The lysate of infected nematodes was added to healthy nematodes, which led to infection. Since for the lysate a filter was used that only allows virus particles to penetrate, this suggested that a virus was the cause of the intestinal abnormalities. Electron microscopy showing viral particles confirmed the role of a virus.

On infection of a susceptible nematode, the viral particles are mainly localized to intestinal cells. The small structure of Orsay virus, its resemblance to the well-studied nodaviruses and its tropism to intestinal cells of C. elegans, together with its lack of infectivity for humans, make Orsay virus a useful virus for studying host–virus interactions.
