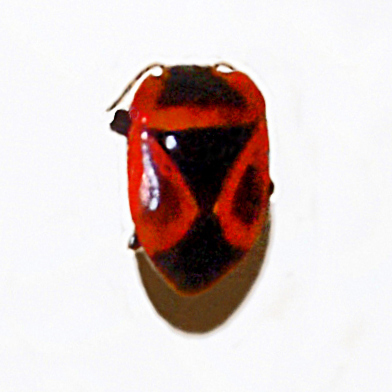
- Dismegistus costalis

Scientific classification
- Kingdom: Animalia
- Phylum: Arthropoda
- Class: Insecta
- Order: Hemiptera
- Suborder: Heteroptera
- Infraorder: Pentatomomorpha
- Superfamily: Pentatomoidea
- Family: Parastrachiidae; Oshanin, 1922

= Parastrachiidae =

Family of true bugs

Parastrachiidae is a family of true bugs belonging to the order Hemiptera. It had been considered to be a subfamily under family Cydnidae, but it was raised to family status in 2002.

== Genera ==
- Dismegistus Amyot & Serville, 1843
- Parastrachia Distant, 1883
