= Yoh Iwasa =

Japanese Mathematical Biologist (born 1952)

Yoh Iwasa (born 1952) is a Japanese Mathematical Biologist who is considered the leading mathematical biologist in Japan.

His work includes the evolution of costly mate preferences and the evolutionary dynamics of cancer. Notable papers include:

- "The evolution of costly mate preferences II. The 'handicap' principle" Evolution 1991
- "Demographic theory for an open marine population with space-limited recruitment" with Joan Roughgarden Ecology 1985
- "Dynamics of chronic myeloid leukaemia" Nature 2005
- "Prey distribution as a factor determining the choice of optimal foraging strategy" The American Naturalist 1981 - JSTOR
- "Influence of nonlinear incidence rates upon the behavior of SIRS epidemiological models" with Simon Levin Journal of Mathematical Biology, 1986

He has mentored more than 20 Ph.D. students and 20 Postdoctoral researchers.
