= RRM3 =

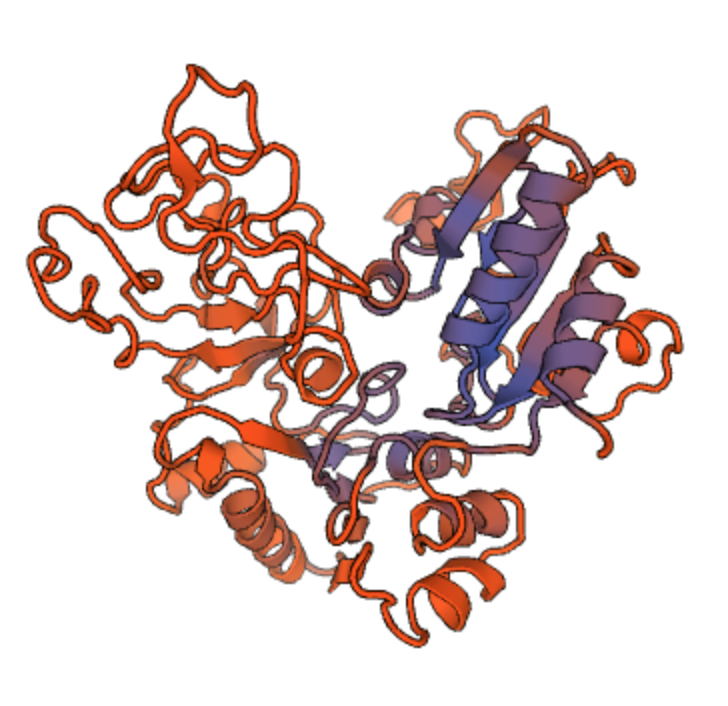
A 3D representation of the RRM3 protein, as modelled by SWISS-MODEL

RRM3 is a gene that encodes a 5′-to-3′ DNA helicase known affect multiple cellular replication and repair processes and is most commonly studied in Saccharomyces cerevisiae. RRM3 formally stands for Ribosomal DNArecombination mutation 3. The gene codes for nuclear protein Rrm3p, which is 723 amino acids in length, and is part of a Pif1p DNA helicase sub-family that is conserved from yeasts to humans. RRM3 and its encoded protein have been shown to be vital for cellular replication, specifically associating with replication forks genome-wide. RRM3 is located on chromosome 8 in yeast cells and codes for 723 amino acids producing a protein that weighs 81,581 Da.

== Protein activity ==
During cellular replication, cells encounter replication fork stalling due to DNA-protein complexes, DNA damage and secondary DNA structures. If replication forks remained stalled, cells risk undergoing irreversible cellular arrest. This type of replication stress is known as fork collapse. Stalled replication forks often lead to DNA breakage, further implicating the importance of unimpaired replication forks on genome integrity. RRM3 helps cells progress through stalled replication forks, although this is a mechanism that is still poorly understood.

Rrm3p is one of many helicase proteins in Saccharomyces cerevisiae. Rrm3p a DNA helicase that unwinds DNA in a 5'-to-3' polarity and has been shown to help DNA replication forks transverse protein-DNA complexes. Rrm3p acts catalytically, and possesses ATPase activity which is thought to be responsible for liberating stalled replication forks. Although the exact use of the ATPase domain is unclear, this domain is significant to helicase function, as removal of the proteins' ATPase function has been demonstrated to have the same inactivity effect on protein action as deleting the gene altogether.

Rrm3p is known to affect an estimated 1400 discrete replication fork sites in the S. cerevisiae genome, including sites at ribosomal DNA repeats, tRNA genes, centromeres, telomeres, G4 DNA and the silent mating-type loci. At these sites, replication forks will stall in the absence of Rrm3p. Inactivation of RRM3 causes chromosomal breakage at these Rrm3p associated sites throughout the genome. Rrm3p is also commonly associated with telomeric and subtelomeric DNA replication, in which its effects are thought to be direct. Although Rrm3p has specific associated sites within the genome, the absence of Rrm3p causes a genome-wide delay in replication including regions that are not Rrm3p-dependant. Furthermore, Rrm3p has been found to move globally in conjunction with proteins associated with the replisome. There is some debate within the literature as to whether Rrm3p is part of the replisome or if it is a protein that is recruited to genomic sites upon pausing of replication forks. Rrm3p is known to affect de novo telomere addition by influencing Pif1p activity on telomeres. Rrm3p is also seen to play a role in replication forks around rDNA, including replication and regulatory regions for transcription of 35S and 5S rRNA's. Rrm3p reduces the accumulation of rDNA circles in yeast, and mutations to Rrmp3 results in increased recombination of ribosomal DNA. This increase in recombination has been attributed to interactions between the protein Rrm3p and actual nucleotide base sequence from rDNA regions, rather than interactions due to the secondary structure formed by tandemly repeated DNA regions. This suggests Rrm3p plays a role in the maintenance of rDNA stability, although the exact mechanistic details are still unclear.

As conserved among the Pif1 proteins, Rrm3p has an efficient G-quadruplex unwinding functionality. Most genomes have many G4 motifs, which are 4 stranded DNA structures. Substantial evidence demonstrates that Rrm3p significantly suppresses replicative damage at G4 sites in yeast genomes. The proteins' G-quadruplex ability has been shown to reduce G4-related genome damage when there is low cellular levels of Pif1.

Along with ATPase and PIP-box domains, the region of amino acids 186-212 in Rrm3p code for a region that binds to Orc5, a domain in an origin recognition complex. The binding of these two proteins appears to be linked to inappropriate replication timing and genome integrity.

== Known interactions ==
Rrm3p physically interacts with multiple proteins in the nucleus. One such interaction is with proliferating cell nuclear antigen (PCNA), a protein essential to eukaryotic DNA replication. PCNA interacts with Rrm3p via the PIP-box motif at the N-terminus of the Rrm3p protein and removal of the PIP-box domain prevents the proteins from interacting. The interaction of these two nuclear proteins is enhanced in the presence of salts, an indication that the interaction between the two is likely hydrophobic. The interaction between PCNA and Rrm3p suggests that Rrm3p may be an accessory DNA helicase that helps replication fork progression through formation of a protein-protein complex with PCNA. Some data has suggested that Rrm3p interacts with Pol2, the catalytic subunit of DNA Polymerase ɛ, which suggests that it may be a part of the replisome. Further evidence of Rrm3p being a replisome component comes from its interactions with Orc5, a domain of the origin recognition complex. Between interactions with PCNA, Pol2 and Orc5, there stands multiple sources of evidence that Rrm3p could be involved in the cellular replisome complex.

Rrm3p is part of a network of DNA replication and helicase proteins. Related proteins include Srs2 and Sgs1, both of which are helicases that work in opposite polarity (3'-to-5') to that of Rrm3p. Simultaneous mutations in RRM3 an SRS2 result in cell arrest at G2/M phase with 2N genomic content, usually with multiple protruding cellular buds and failed nuclear division. Knockout mutations in both RRM3 and Sgs1 produces viable cells that display severe growth defects. The full understanding of the network and mechanisms between these proteins is still to be discovered.

Evidence suggests that Rrm3p works in association with the MRX complex, a protein complex required for double stranded break repair of DNA. RRM3 mutants with simultaneous mutations in subunits of MRX produce cells with severe growth defects which are mainly due to deficiencies in telomere maintenance.

Rrm3p has also been seen to interact with Fob1, Csm3 and Tof1. At rDNA coding regions within the genome there are termination sites that are associated with termination protein Fob1. In conjunction with S-phase checkpoint proteins Csm3 and Tof1, Fob1 creates a protein complex that inhibits the function of Rrm3p. During replication, the catalytic abilities of Rrm3p allow it to remove Fob1 from rDNA sites before the replication fork unwinds the area, allowing for smooth progression of replication forks.

== Mutations and absence of Rrm3p ==
Successful genome replication is in many circumstances dependent on the presence and action of RRM3. Cells with the no cellular Rrm3p show high levels of DNA damage during replication, however the actual breaking of DNA is likely a secondary consequence of multiple DNA replication errors due to Rrm3p absence. Mutations to RRM3 in yeast produces cells that show a delay in S-phase transitioning and colonies of mutants typically show larger proportions of cells in the G2/M phase. RRM3 also has significant ties to yeast transposon mobility. In cells with mutations to RRM3, mobility of the Ty1 yeast transposon increases 110-fold, strong evidence that RRM3 has a role in the processing of Ty1 cDNA.

== Gene and product data ==
RRM3
Gene Location	Chromosome VIII (Yeast)
Protein Product	Rrm3p
Rrm3p
Weight	81,581 Da
Length	723 Amino Acids
Start (Yeast):	170,799
Stop:	172,970
Exon Count:	1
Uniprot	P38766
