= Caenorhabditis japonica =

Scientific classification
- Domain: Eukaryota
- Kingdom: Animalia
- Phylum: Nematoda
- Class: Chromadorea
- Order: Rhabditida
- Family: Rhabditidae
- Genus: Caenorhabditis
- Species: C. japonica

Binomial name
- Caenorhabditis japonica Kiontke et al, 2002

Species of roundworm

Caenorhabditis japonica is a species of nematodes in the genus Caenorhabditis. Its genome was sequenced by the McDonnell Genome Institute at Washington University School of Medicine. This gonochoristic species is found in the 'Japonica' group, the sister clade to the 'Elegans' group, in the 'Elegans' supergroup.

In the wild, this species is found non-parasitically associated with the burrower bugs Parastrachia japonensis (Heteroptera: Cydnidae) and may be able to enter the dauer stage regardless of food and crowding conditions.
