= Ciini =

Scientific classification
- Domain: Eukaryota
- Kingdom: Animalia
- Phylum: Arthropoda
- Class: Insecta
- Order: Coleoptera
- Suborder: Polyphaga
- Infraorder: Cucujiformia
- Family: Ciidae
- Subfamily: Ciinae
- Tribe: Ciini; Leach, 1819

Tribe of beetles

Ciini is a tribe of minute tree-fungus beetles in the family Ciidae. There are at least 30 genera in Ciini.

== Genera ==
These 32 genera belong to the tribe ciini:

- Acanthocis Miyatake, 1954
- Anoplocis Kawanabe, 1996^{c g}
- Apterocis Perkins, 1900^{i c g}
- Atlantocis Israelson, 1985
- Ceracis Mellié, 1848^{i c g b}
- Cis Latreille, 1796^{i c g b}
- Cisarthron Reitter, 1885
- Dichodontocis Kawanabe, 1994
- Dimerapterocis Scott, 1926
- Diphyllocis Reitter, 1885
- Dolichocis Dury, 1919^{i c g}
- Ennearthron Mellié, 1847^{i c g}
- Euxestocis Miyatake, 1954
- Falsocis Pic, 1916
- Hadreule Thomson, 1859^{b}
- Lipopterocis Miyatake, 1954
- Malacocis Gorham, 1886^{i c g b}
- Neoapterocis Lopes-Andrade, 2007
- Neoennearthron Miyatake, 1954
- Nipponapterocis Miyatake, 1954
- Nipponocis Nobuchi & Wada, 1955
- Odontocis Nakane & Nobuchi, 1955
- Orthocis Casey, 1898^{i c g b}
- Paraxestocis Miyatake, 1954
- Phellinocis Lopes-Andrade & Lawrence, 2005
- Plesiocis Casey, 1898^{i c g b}
- Polynesicis Zimmerman, 1938
- Porculus Lawrence, 1987
- Strigocis Dury, 1917^{i c g b}
- Sulcacis Dury, 1917^{i c g b}
- Trichapus Friedenreich, 1881
- Wagaicis Lohse, 1964

Data sources: i = ITIS, c = Catalogue of Life, g = GBIF, b = Bugguide.net
