= List of Cis species =

This is a list of 154 species in Cis, a genus of minute tree-fungus beetles in the family Ciidae.

== Cis species ==
- Cis acritus Lawrence, 1971^{i c g}
- Cis adamsoni Blair, 1932^{g}
- Cis alienus Sharp, 1879^{i c g}
- Cis americanus Mannerheim, 1852^{i c g}
- Cis angustiformis Perkins, 1900^{i c g}
- Cis angustus Hatch, 1962^{i c g}
- Cis arbustensis Zimmerman, 1938^{g}
- Cis atromaculatus Pic, 1916^{g}
- Cis aureopubens Pic, 1922^{g}
- Cis biacutus Reitter, 1908^{g}
- Cis biarmatus Mannerheim, 1852^{i c g}
- Cis bicolor Sharp, 1879^{i c g}
- Cis bidentatus (Olivier, 1790)^{g}
- Cis bilamellatus Wood, 1884^{g}
- Cis bimaculatus Sharp, 1885^{i c g}
- Cis bisetosus Blair, 1935^{g}
- Cis boleti (Scopoli, 1763)^{i c g}
- Cis breviformis Perkins, 1900^{i c g}
- Cis calidus Sharp, 1885^{i c g}
- Cis castaneus (Herbst, 1793)^{g}
- Cis castlei (Dury, 1917)^{i c g}
- Cis cayensis Lawrence, 1971^{i c g}
- Cis cheesmanae Blair, 1927^{g}
- Cis chinensis Lawrence, 1991^{g b}
- Cis chloroticus Sharp, 1885^{i c g}
- Cis chujoi Miyatake, 1982^{g}
- Cis cognatissimus Perkins, 1900^{i c g}
- Cis comptus Gyllenhal, 1827^{g}
- Cis congestus Casey, 1898^{i c g}
- Cis coriaceus Baudi, 1873^{g}
- Cis cornelli Lawrence, 1971^{i c g}
- Cis cornutus Blatchley, 1910^{i c g}
- Cis creberrimus Mellié, 1848^{i c g b}
- Cis crinitus Lawrence, 1971^{i c g}
- Cis cucullatus Wollaston, 1865^{g}
- Cis dentatus Mellié, 1848^{g}
- Cis diminutivus Sharp, 1879^{i c g}
- Cis discolor Lawrence, 1971^{i c g}
- Cis dracaenae Perkins, 1931^{i c g}
- Cis dufaui Pic, 1922^{g}
- Cis dunedinensis Leng, 1918^{i c g}
- Cis duplex Casey, 1898^{i c g}
- Cis elongatus (Montrouzier, 1861)^{g}
- Cis ephippiatus Mannerheim, 1853^{i c g}
- Cis evanescens Sharp, 1879^{i c g}
- Cis fagi Waltl, 1839^{g}
- Cis fallax Perkins, 1900^{i c g}
- Cis festivulus Lawrence, 1971^{i c g}
- Cis fissicollis Mellié, 1848^{g}
- Cis fissicornis Mellié, 1848^{g}
- Cis fiuzai Almeida & Lopes-Andrade^{g}
- Cis floridae Dury, 1917^{i c g}
- Cis furcicollis Blair, 1935^{g}
- Cis fusciclavis Nyholm, 1954^{g}
- Cis fuscipes Mellié, 1848^{i c g b} (minute tree-fungus beetle)
- Cis glabratus Mellié, 1848^{g}
- Cis gladiator Flach, 1882^{g}
- Cis graecus Schilsky, 1901^{g}
- Cis gravipennis Perkins, 1931^{i c g}
- Cis guerini Mellié, 1848^{g}
- Cis gumiercostai Almeida & Lopes-Andrade^{g}
- Cis haleakalae Perkins, 1900^{i c g}
- Cis hanseni Strand, 1965^{g}
- Cis hirsutus Casey, 1898^{i c g b}
- Cis hispidus (Paykull, 1798)^{g}
- Cis horridulus Casey, 1898^{i c g}
- Cis huachucae Dury, 1917^{i c g}
- Cis hystriculus Casey, 1898^{i c g}
- Cis immaturus Zimmerman, 1939^{i c g}
- Cis infasciata Pic, 1922^{g}
- Cis insularis Blackburn & Sharp, 1885^{g}
- Cis insulicola Dalla Torre, 1911^{i c g}
- Cis interpunctatus Mellié, 1848^{g}
- Cis jacquemartii Mellié, 1848^{g}
- Cis kauaiensis Perkins, 1900^{i c g}
- Cis krausi Dalla Torre, 1911^{i c g}
- Cis laeticulus Sharp, 1879^{i c g}
- Cis laminatus Mellié, 1848^{i c g}
- Cis lasoni ^{g}
- Cis levettei (Casey, 1898)^{i c g b}
- Cis lineatocribratus Mellié, 1848^{g}
- Cis longipennis Sharp, 1885^{i c g}
- Cis lugowoji ^{g}
- Cis maritimus (Hatch, 1962)^{i c g}
- Cis marquesanus Blair, 1927^{g}
- Cis megastictus Lawrence, 1971^{i c g}
- Cis melliei Coquerel, 1849^{g}
- Cis micans (Fabricius, 1792)^{g}
- Cis miles (Casey, 1898)^{i c g}
- Cis mimus Perkins, 1900^{i c g}
- Cis minimus (Montrouzier, 1861)^{g}
- Cis mirabilis Perkins, 1900^{i c g}
- Cis molokaiensis Perkins, 1900^{i c g}
- Cis montevagus Zimmerman, 1938^{g}
- Cis multidentatus Pic, 1920^{g}
- Cis nesiotes Perkins, 1900^{i c g}
- Cis niedhauki Lawrence, 1971^{i c g}
- Cis nigrofasciata Pic, 1922^{g}
- Cis nigrofasciatus Blackburn, 1885^{i c g}
- Cis nudipennis Perkins, 1931^{i c g}
- Cis obscuripennis Pic, 1922^{g}
- Cis occamy Rosa-Oliveira & Lopes-Andrade, 2023^{g}
- Cis olivieri Mellié, 1848^{g}
- Cis pacificus Sharp, 1879^{i c g}
- Cis parallelus Scott, 1926^{g}
- Cis paritii Perkins, 1933^{i c g}
- Cis pickeri Lopes-Andrade, Matushkina, Buder & Klass, 2009^{g}
- Cis pistoria Casey, 1898^{i c g}
- Cis polysticti Chujo, 1939^{g}
- Cis porcatus Sharp, 1879^{i c g}
- Cis pumilio Baudi de Selve, 1873^{g}
- Cis puncticollis Wollaston, 1860^{g}
- Cis punctifer Mellié, 1848^{g}
- Cis punctulatus Gyllenhal, 1827^{g}
- Cis pusillus Gorham, 1898^{g}
- Cis quadridens Mellié, 1848^{g}
- Cis quadridentatus (Dury, 1917)^{i c g b}
- Cis quadridentulus Perris, 1874^{g}
- Cis ragusai Roubal, 1916^{g}
- Cis rapaae Zimmerman, 1938^{g}
- Cis regius Orsetti & Lopes-Andrade^{g}
- Cis renominatus ^{g}
- Cis retithorax Scott, 1926^{g}
- Cis robiniophilus Lawrence, 1971^{i c g}
- Cis roridus Sharp, 1885^{i c g}
- Cis rotundulus Lawrence, 1971^{i c g b}
- Cis rugulosus Mellié, 1848^{g}
- Cis setarius Sharp, 1885^{i c g}
- Cis setiger Mellié, 1848^{g}
- Cis signatus Sharp, 1879^{i c g}
- Cis simulator Perkins, 1900^{i c g}
- Cis stereophilus Lawrence, 1971^{i c g}
- Cis striatulus Mellié, 1848^{g}
- Cis striolatus Casey, 1898^{i c g}
- Cis subfuscus Gorham, 1886^{i c g b}
- Cis submicans Abeille de Perrin^{g b}
- Cis subtilis Mellié, 1848^{i c g}
- Cis tabidus Sharp, 1879^{i c g}
- Cis tahitiensis Zimmerman, 1938^{g}
- Cis taiwanus Chujo, 1939^{g}
- Cis taurus Reitter, 1878^{g}
- Cis tetracentrum Gorham, 1886^{i c g}
- Cis tomentosus Mellié, 1848^{g}
- Cis tridentatus Mannerheim, 1852^{i c g}
- Cis tristis Mellié, 1848^{i c g}
- Cis uapouae Zimmerman, 1938^{g}
- Cis unicus Perkins, 1900^{i c g}
- Cis ursulinus Casey, 1898^{i c g}
- Cis vagans Perkins, 1926^{i c g}
- Cis versicolor Casey, 1898^{i c g b}
- Cis villosulus (Marsham, 1802)^{g}
- Cis vitulus Mannerheim, 1843^{i c g b}
- Cis wollastoni Mellié, 1849^{g}

Data sources: i = ITIS, c = Catalogue of Life, g = GBIF, b = Bugguide.net

== Selected former species ==
- Cis lemoulti Pic, 1923
