= Ciinae =

- Octotemnus sp.

Scientific classification
- Kingdom: Animalia
- Phylum: Arthropoda
- Clade: Pancrustacea
- Class: Insecta
- Order: Coleoptera
- Suborder: Polyphaga
- Infraorder: Cucujiformia
- Family: Ciidae
- Subfamily: Ciinae; Leach, 1819

Subfamily of insects

Ciinae is a subfamily of minute tree-fungus beetles in the family Ciidae. It was first described by William Leach in 1819. It contains 2 tribes, with 22 genera, and 355 accepted species.

Observations of members of Ciinae have been made on every continent except for Antarctica. The majority of observations have been made in France, Sweden, Norway, and the United Kingdom.

== Tribes and genera ==
- Ciini Leach, 1819
  - Ceracis Mellié, 1848
  - Cis Latreille, 1797
  - Ditrichocis (provisionally accepted) Lawrence, 2016
  - Dolichocis Lawrence, 2016
  - Ennearthron Mellié, 1847
  - Hadreule Thomson, 1859
  - Malacocis Gorham, 1886
  - Neoennearthron Miyatake, 1954
  - Nipponocis Nobuchi, 1955
  - Orthocis Casey, 1898
  - Paratrichapus Scott, 1926
  - Plesiocis Casey, 1898
  - Sulcacis Dury, 1917
- Orophiini C.G. Thomson, 1863
  - Octotemnus Mellié, 1847
  - Ropalodontus Mellié, 1847
  - Xylographus Mellié, 1849
