= Hadraule =

Scientific classification
- Kingdom: Animalia
- Phylum: Arthropoda
- Class: Insecta
- Order: Coleoptera
- Suborder: Polyphaga
- Infraorder: Cucujiformia
- Family: Ciidae
- Genus: Hadreule; C.G. Thomson, 1859

Genus of beetles

Hadreule is a genus of tree-fungus beetles in the family Ciidae.

== Species ==
- Hadreule blaisdelli
- Hadreule elongulata Gyllenhal, 1827
- Hadreule fukudai M. Chûjô, 1940
- Hadreule heiroglyphica Reitter, 1877
- Hadreule japonica Nobuchi, 1955
- Hadreule sinica Pic, 1954
- Hadreule subrobusta Miyatake, 1955
