= Orthocis punctatus =

Scientific classification
- Domain: Eukaryota
- Kingdom: Animalia
- Phylum: Arthropoda
- Class: Insecta
- Order: Coleoptera
- Suborder: Polyphaga
- Infraorder: Cucujiformia
- Family: Ciidae
- Tribe: Ciini
- Genus: Orthocis
- Species: O. punctatus

Binomial name
- Orthocis punctatus (Mellié, 1848)

Synonyms
- Cis punctatus Mellié, 1848; Orthocis aterrimus Casey, 1898

Species of beetle

Orthocis punctatus is a species of minute tree-fungus beetle in the family Ciidae. It is found in North America.
