= Cis rotundulus =

Scientific classification
- Domain: Eukaryota
- Kingdom: Animalia
- Phylum: Arthropoda
- Class: Insecta
- Order: Coleoptera
- Suborder: Polyphaga
- Infraorder: Cucujiformia
- Family: Ciidae
- Subfamily: Ciinae
- Genus: Cis
- Species: C. rotundulus

Binomial name
- Cis rotundulus Lawrence, 1971

Species of beetle

Cis rotundulus is a species of minute tree-fungus beetle in the family Ciidae. It is found in North America.
