= Orthocis transversatus =

Scientific classification
- Domain: Eukaryota
- Kingdom: Animalia
- Phylum: Arthropoda
- Class: Insecta
- Order: Coleoptera
- Suborder: Polyphaga
- Infraorder: Cucujiformia
- Family: Ciidae
- Tribe: Ciini
- Genus: Orthocis
- Species: O. transversatus

Binomial name
- Orthocis transversatus (Kraus, 1908)

Synonyms
- Ennearthron pallidus Kraus, 1908; Ennearthron transversatus Kraus, 1908; Orthocis pallidus (Kraus, 1908)

Species of beetle

Orthocis transversatus is a species of minute tree-fungus beetle in the family Ciidae. It is found in North America.
