= Cis creberrimus =

Scientific classification
- Domain: Eukaryota
- Kingdom: Animalia
- Phylum: Arthropoda
- Class: Insecta
- Order: Coleoptera
- Suborder: Polyphaga
- Infraorder: Cucujiformia
- Family: Ciidae
- Subfamily: Ciinae
- Genus: Cis
- Species: C. creberrimus

Binomial name
- Cis creberrimus Mellié, 1848

Synonyms
- Cis nubillus Gorham, 1898; Cis puberulus Mellié, 1848

Species of beetle

Cis creberrimus is a species of minute tree-fungus beetle in the family Ciidae. It is found in the Caribbean Sea, Central America, North America, and South America.
