= Cis versicolor =

Scientific classification
- Kingdom: Animalia
- Phylum: Arthropoda
- Class: Insecta
- Order: Coleoptera
- Suborder: Polyphaga
- Infraorder: Cucujiformia
- Family: Ciidae
- Subfamily: Ciinae
- Genus: Cis
- Species: C. versicolor

Binomial name
- Cis versicolor Casey, 1898

Species of beetle

Cis versicolor is a species of minute tree-fungus beetle in the family Ciidae. It is found in Central America and North America.
