= Cis levettei =

Scientific classification
- Kingdom: Animalia
- Phylum: Arthropoda
- Class: Insecta
- Order: Coleoptera
- Suborder: Polyphaga
- Infraorder: Cucujiformia
- Family: Ciidae
- Subfamily: Ciinae
- Genus: Cis
- Species: C. levettei

Binomial name
- Cis levettei (Casey, 1898)

Synonyms
- Xestocis levettei Casey, 1898

Species of beetle

Cis levettei is a species of minute tree-fungus beetle in the family Ciidae. It is found in North America.
