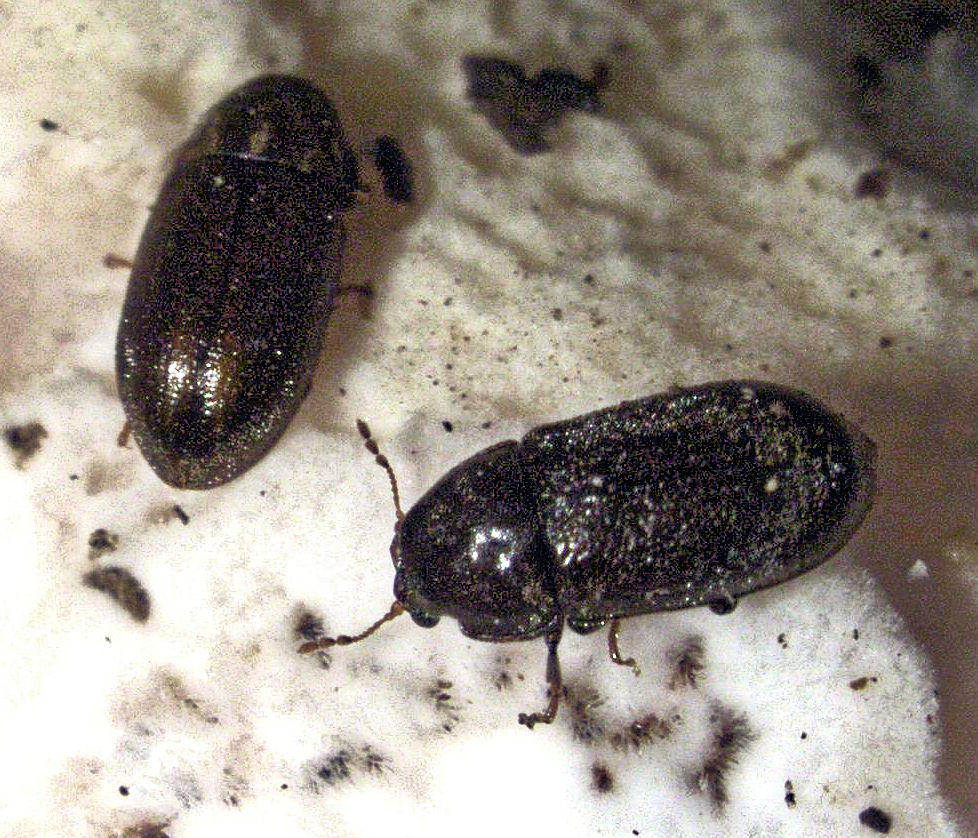
- two live adult Cis boleti

Scientific classification
- Domain: Eukaryota
- Kingdom: Animalia
- Phylum: Arthropoda
- Class: Insecta
- Order: Coleoptera
- Suborder: Polyphaga
- Infraorder: Cucujiformia
- Family: Ciidae
- Subfamily: Ciinae
- Genus: Cis
- Species: C. fuscipes

Binomial name
- Cis fuscipes Mellié, 1848

Synonyms
- Cis atripennis Mellié, 1848; Cis carolinae Casey, 1898; Cis chevrolatii Mellié, 1848; Cis dubius Mellié, 1848; Cis impressus Casey, 1898; Cis pallens Casey, 1898

= Cis fuscipes =

Species of beetle

Cis fuscipes, the minute tree-fungus beetle, is a species of minute tree-fungus beetle in the family Ciidae. It is found in Australia, the Caribbean, North America, Oceania, and Europe.
