= Cis quadridentatus =

Scientific classification
- Domain: Eukaryota
- Kingdom: Animalia
- Phylum: Arthropoda
- Class: Insecta
- Order: Coleoptera
- Suborder: Polyphaga
- Infraorder: Cucujiformia
- Family: Ciidae
- Subfamily: Ciinae
- Genus: Cis
- Species: C. quadridentatus

Binomial name
- Cis quadridentatus (Dury, 1917)

Synonyms
- Cis blatchleyi Dury, 1917; Xestocis quadridentatus Dury, 1917

Species of beetle

Cis quadridentatus is a species of minute tree-fungus beetle in the family Ciidae. It is found in North America.
