= Cis occamy =

Scientific classification
- Domain: Eukaryota
- Kingdom: Animalia
- Phylum: Arthropoda
- Class: Insecta
- Order: Coleoptera
- Suborder: Polyphaga
- Infraorder: Cucujiformia
- Family: Ciidae
- Subfamily: Ciinae
- Genus: Cis
- Species: C. occamy

Binomial name
- Cis occamy Rosa-Oliveira & Lopes-Andrade, 2023

Species of beetle

Cis occamy is a species of minute tree-fungus beetle in the family Ciidae. It is found in Brazil.

Phylogenetically, it is inside the Cis bilamellatus species-group, defined by characteristics in the male and female genitalia.

It has been found in Atlantic Forest biomes in the states of São Paulo (Rio Claro being its type locality), Minas Gerais, Espírito Santo and Rio Grande do Sul, in Brazil.

It uses several bracket fungi as hosts. The species identified are Fabisporus sanguineus, Trametes membranacea, Trametes villosa and Fuscoporia gilva.

The etymology of the species name is an homage to occamy, a fictitious creature in the Harry Potter universe, named after the principle of Ockham's razor.
