= Sulcacis curtulus =

Scientific classification
- Kingdom: Animalia
- Phylum: Arthropoda
- Class: Insecta
- Order: Coleoptera
- Suborder: Polyphaga
- Infraorder: Cucujiformia
- Family: Ciidae
- Tribe: Ciini
- Genus: Sulcacis
- Species: S. curtulus

Binomial name
- Sulcacis curtulus (Casey, 1898)

Synonyms
- Cis criddlei Dury, 1919; Cis cylindricus Dury, 1917; Cis montana Casey, 1898; Cis sorror Casey, 1898; Sulcacis criddlei (Dury, 1919); Sulcacis cylindricus (Dury, 1917); Sulcacis montana Casey, 1898; Sulcacis niger Dury, 1917; Sulcacis sorror (Casey, 1898)

Species of beetle

Sulcacis curtulus is a species of minute tree-fungus beetle in the family Ciidae. It is found in North America.
