= Cis vitulus =

Scientific classification
- Domain: Eukaryota
- Kingdom: Animalia
- Phylum: Arthropoda
- Class: Insecta
- Order: Coleoptera
- Suborder: Polyphaga
- Infraorder: Cucujiformia
- Family: Ciidae
- Subfamily: Ciinae
- Genus: Cis
- Species: C. vitulus

Binomial name
- Cis vitulus Mannerheim, 1843

Synonyms
- Cis caseyi Dalla Torre, 1911

Species of beetle

Cis vitulus is a species of minute tree-fungus beetle in the family Ciidae. It is found in North America.
