= Ceracis thoracicornis =

Scientific classification
- Domain: Eukaryota
- Kingdom: Animalia
- Phylum: Arthropoda
- Class: Insecta
- Order: Coleoptera
- Suborder: Polyphaga
- Infraorder: Cucujiformia
- Family: Ciidae
- Tribe: Ciini
- Genus: Ceracis
- Species: C. thoracicornis

Binomial name
- Ceracis thoracicornis (Ziegler, 1845)

Synonyms
- Ceracis bifoveatus Dury, 1917; Ceracis laminifrons (Casey, 1898); Ceracis mellyi (Mellié, 1848); Ceracis oblongus Blatchley, 1910; Ceracis piceus (Casey, 1898); Ceracis pumicatus (Mellié, 1848); Ceracis unicolor (Casey, 1884); Cis thoracicornis Ziegler, 1845; Ennearthron laminifrons Casey, 1898; Ennearthron mellyi Mellié, 1848; Ennearthron oblongus Blatchley, 1910; Ennearthron piceus Casey, 1898; Ennearthron unicolor Casey, 1884

Species of beetle

Ceracis thoracicornis is a species of minute tree-fungus beetle in the family Ciidae. It is found in North America.
