= Sulcacis lengi =

Scientific classification
- Domain: Eukaryota
- Kingdom: Animalia
- Phylum: Arthropoda
- Class: Insecta
- Order: Coleoptera
- Suborder: Polyphaga
- Infraorder: Cucujiformia
- Family: Ciidae
- Tribe: Ciini
- Genus: Sulcacis
- Species: S. lengi

Binomial name
- Sulcacis lengi Dury, 1917

Species of beetle

Sulcacis lengi is a species of minute tree-fungus beetle in the family Ciidae. It is found in North America.
