= Cis hirsutus =

Scientific classification
- Kingdom: Animalia
- Phylum: Arthropoda
- Class: Insecta
- Order: Coleoptera
- Suborder: Polyphaga
- Infraorder: Cucujiformia
- Family: Ciidae
- Subfamily: Ciinae
- Genus: Cis
- Species: C. hirsutus

Binomial name
- Cis hirsutus Casey, 1898

Species of beetle

Cis hirsutus is a species of minute tree-fungus beetle in the family Ciidae. It is found in the Caribbean Sea and North America.
