= Ceracis californicus =

Scientific classification
- Kingdom: Animalia
- Phylum: Arthropoda
- Class: Insecta
- Order: Coleoptera
- Suborder: Polyphaga
- Infraorder: Cucujiformia
- Family: Ciidae
- Tribe: Ciini
- Genus: Ceracis
- Species: C. californicus

Binomial name
- Ceracis californicus (Casey, 1884)

Synonyms
- Ceracis coloradensis (Dury, 1917); Ceracis convergens (Casey, 1898); Ceracis discolor (Casey, 1898); Ceracis grossulus (Casey, 1898); Ceracis oregonus (Dury, 1917); Ennearthron californicus Casey, 1884; Ennearthron coloradensis Casey, 1917; Ennearthron convergens Casey, 1898; Ennearthron discolor Casey, 1898; Ennearthron grossulus Casey, 1898; Ennearthron oregonus Dury, 1917

Species of beetle

Ceracis californicus is a species of minute tree-fungus beetle in the family Ciidae. It is found in Central America and North America.
