= Malacocis brevicollis =

Scientific classification
- Kingdom: Animalia
- Phylum: Arthropoda
- Class: Insecta
- Order: Coleoptera
- Suborder: Polyphaga
- Infraorder: Cucujiformia
- Family: Ciidae
- Tribe: Ciini
- Genus: Malacocis
- Species: M. brevicollis

Binomial name
- Malacocis brevicollis (Casey, 1898)

Synonyms
- Brachycis brevicollis Casey, 1898

Species of beetle

Malacocis brevicollis is a species of minute tree-fungus beetle in the family Ciidae. It is found in North America.
