= Ceracis nigropunctatus =

Scientific classification
- Domain: Eukaryota
- Kingdom: Animalia
- Phylum: Arthropoda
- Class: Insecta
- Order: Coleoptera
- Suborder: Polyphaga
- Infraorder: Cucujiformia
- Family: Ciidae
- Tribe: Ciini
- Genus: Ceracis
- Species: C. nigropunctatus

Binomial name
- Ceracis nigropunctatus Lawrence, 1967

Species of beetle

Ceracis nigropunctatus is a species of minute tree-fungus beetle in the family Ciidae. It is found in Central America and North America.
