= Macrocis monnei =

Scientific classification
- Kingdom: Animalia
- Phylum: Arthropoda
- Clade: Pancrustacea
- Class: Insecta
- Order: Coleoptera
- Suborder: Polyphaga
- Infraorder: Cucujiformia
- Family: Ciidae
- Genus: Macrocis
- Species: M. monnei

Binomial name
- Macrocis monnei Lopes-Andrade, Souza-Gonçalves & Sandoval-Gómez, 2026

Species of beetle

Macrocis monnei is a species of beetle of the family Ciidae. It is found in Brazil (Tocantins).

== Description ==
Adults reach a length of about 1.78–2.03 mm (0.070–0.080 in). They have a robust, strongly convex body, with the sides subparallel for most of their lengths. The dorsum is brown and the venter is brown, except for the pale hypomera and coxae, and the light brownish prosternum and femora. There is a dorsal vestiture of conspicuous suberect to erect, stout yellowish bristles and a ventral vestiture of decumbent, long, slender yellowish setae.

== Life history ==
The species has been collected from two distinct trametoid basidiomes in the same forest. The basidiomes were heavily degraded, with most of their tissues consumed by ciid beetles. It was not possible to accurately determine the species, but they resembled highly degraded basidiomes of Trametes polyzona.

== Etymology ==
The species is dedicated to Miguel Angel Monné Barrios.
