= Xylographus nitidissimus =

Scientific classification
- Kingdom: Animalia
- Phylum: Arthropoda
- Class: Insecta
- Order: Coleoptera
- Suborder: Polyphaga
- Infraorder: Cucujiformia
- Family: Ciidae
- Genus: Xylographus
- Species: X. nitidiissimus

Binomial name
- Xylographus nitidiissimus Pic, 1916

Synonyms
- Xylographus longicolis

Species of beetle

Xylographus nitidissimus is a species of beetles of the family Ciidae. It occurs in São Tomé and Príncipe. The species was first described in 1916.
