= Cis olivieri =

Scientific classification
- Kingdom: Animalia
- Phylum: Arthropoda
- Clade: Pancrustacea
- Class: Insecta
- Order: Coleoptera
- Suborder: Polyphaga
- Infraorder: Cucujiformia
- Family: Ciidae
- Genus: Cis
- Species: C. olivieri

Binomial name
- Cis olivieri Mellié, 1848

Synonyms
- Cis lemoulti Pic, 1923

Species of beetle

Cis olivieri is a species of beetle of the family Ciidae. It is found in French Guiana, Brazil (Minas Gerais, Pernambuco).

== Description ==
Adults reach a length of about 1.4–1.65 mm (0.055–0.065 in). They have an elongate, convex, subparallel-sided body. The dorsum and venter are reddish pale brown. The dorsal vestiture is single, consisting of short suberect bristles, while the ventral vestiture consists of fine decumbent setae.
