= Macrocis taurus =

Scientific classification
- Kingdom: Animalia
- Phylum: Arthropoda
- Clade: Pancrustacea
- Class: Insecta
- Order: Coleoptera
- Suborder: Polyphaga
- Infraorder: Cucujiformia
- Family: Ciidae
- Genus: Macrocis
- Species: M. taurus

Binomial name
- Macrocis taurus Reitter, 1878

Synonyms
- Cis taurus

Species of beetle

Macrocis taurus is a species of beetle of the family Ciidae. It is found in Mexico.

== Description ==
The body is convex, elongated and subglabrous. The pronotum has single punctation and microreticulate sculpture between the punctures. The lateral margins are explanate, weakly crenulated and visible for their entire lengths from above. The elytral punctation is dual and subseriate. Males have a frontoclypeal ridge bearing a pair of parallel and conical horns with acute apices and abdominal sex patch approximately one-half of the length of the first abdominal ventrite at the longitudinal midline at the centre of the ventrite.
