= Macrocis diabolicus =

Scientific classification
- Kingdom: Animalia
- Phylum: Arthropoda
- Clade: Pancrustacea
- Class: Insecta
- Order: Coleoptera
- Suborder: Polyphaga
- Infraorder: Cucujiformia
- Family: Ciidae
- Genus: Macrocis
- Species: M. diabolicus

Binomial name
- Macrocis diabolicus Reitter, 1878

Synonyms
- Cis diabolicus; Macrocis bison Reitter, 1878; Cis bison

Species of beetle

Macrocis diabolicus is a species of beetle of the family Ciidae. It is found in Colombia.

== Description ==
Adults reach a length of about 2.34–2.6 mm (0.092–0.102 in). The body is convex and elongated with the dorsal vestiture consisting of long and slender greyish setae. The pronotum has coarse and single punctation, the punctures being very close to each other and the pronotum surface between the punctures is smooth. The lateral margins are explanate, crenulated and visible for their entire lengths from above. The elytral punctation is dual and not seriate.
