= Orthocis zoufali =

Scientific classification
- Kingdom: Animalia
- Phylum: Arthropoda
- Class: Insecta
- Order: Coleoptera
- Suborder: Polyphaga
- Infraorder: Cucujiformia
- Family: Ciidae
- Genus: Orthocis
- Species: O. zoufali

Binomial name
- Orthocis zoufali Reitter, 1902

Synonyms
- Cis zoufali Reitter, 1902

Species of beetle

Orthocis zoufali is a species of tree-fungus beetle in Ciidae family which is endemic to Bosnia and Herzegovina.
