= Macrocis grandicornis =

Scientific classification
- Kingdom: Animalia
- Phylum: Arthropoda
- Clade: Pancrustacea
- Class: Insecta
- Order: Coleoptera
- Suborder: Polyphaga
- Infraorder: Cucujiformia
- Family: Ciidae
- Genus: Macrocis
- Species: M. grandicornis

Binomial name
- Macrocis grandicornis Pic, 1917

Synonyms
- Cis grandicornis

Species of beetle

Macrocis grandicornis is a species of beetle of the family Ciidae. It is found in French Guiana.

== Description ==
Adults reach a length of about 2.07 mm (0.081 in). The body is strongly convex, rounded and strongly robust with the dorsal vestiture consisting of long and thick yellowish setae. The pronotum has single punctation and the surface between the punctures has a hexagonal microreticulated sculpture. The lateral margins are not explanate, not crenulated and not visible from above. The elytral punctation is dual and not seriate.
