= Macrocis testaceimembris =

Scientific classification
- Kingdom: Animalia
- Phylum: Arthropoda
- Clade: Pancrustacea
- Class: Insecta
- Order: Coleoptera
- Suborder: Polyphaga
- Infraorder: Cucujiformia
- Family: Ciidae
- Genus: Macrocis
- Species: M. testaceimembris

Binomial name
- Macrocis testaceimembris Pic, 1916

Synonyms
- Cis testaceimembris

Species of beetle

Macrocis testaceimembris is a species of beetle of the family Ciidae. It is found in Brazil (Santa Catarina).

== Description ==
Adults reach a length of about 1.7 mm (0.067 in). The body is strongly convex and elongated with dense dorsal vestiture of short and thick yellowish setae. The pronotum has single punctation and the surface between the punctures has a hexagonal microreticulated sculpture. The lateral margins are weakly explanate, crenulated and barely visible for their entire lengths from above. The elytral punctation is dual and not seriate. Males have a frontoclypeal ridge bearing a pair of parallel, cylindrical and a bit flattened horns with rounded apices and very small abdominal sex patch, being an inconspicuous mark at the centre of the ventrite at the midline.
