= Cis subfuscus =

Scientific classification
- Domain: Eukaryota
- Kingdom: Animalia
- Phylum: Arthropoda
- Class: Insecta
- Order: Coleoptera
- Suborder: Polyphaga
- Infraorder: Cucujiformia
- Family: Ciidae
- Genus: Cis
- Species: C. subfuscus

Binomial name
- Cis subfuscus Gorham, 1886

Species of beetle

Cis subfuscus is a species of minute tree-fungus beetle in the family Ciidae. It is found in Central America and North America.
