= Macrocis longipilis =

Scientific classification
- Kingdom: Animalia
- Phylum: Arthropoda
- Clade: Pancrustacea
- Class: Insecta
- Order: Coleoptera
- Suborder: Polyphaga
- Infraorder: Cucujiformia
- Family: Ciidae
- Genus: Macrocis
- Species: M. longipilis

Binomial name
- Macrocis longipilis (Pic, 1930)

Synonyms
- Cis longipilis Pic, 1930

Species of beetle

Macrocis longipilis is a species of beetle of the family Ciidae. It is found in Argentina.
