= Macrocis pubescens =

Scientific classification
- Kingdom: Animalia
- Phylum: Arthropoda
- Clade: Pancrustacea
- Class: Insecta
- Order: Coleoptera
- Suborder: Polyphaga
- Infraorder: Cucujiformia
- Family: Ciidae
- Genus: Macrocis
- Species: M. pubescens

Binomial name
- Macrocis pubescens (Friedenreich, 1881)

Synonyms
- Trichapus pubescens Friedenreich, 1881; Cis pubescens

Species of beetle

Macrocis pubescens is a species of beetle of the family Ciidae. It is found in Brazil (Santa Catarina, São Paulo, Rio de Janeiro, Minas Gerais, Espírito Santo, Bahia, Pará), Panama and Mexico.

== Description ==
Adults reach a length of about 1.4–2.25 mm (0.055–0.089 in). The body is convex and elongated with the dorsal vestiture consisting of long and slender yellowish setae. The pronotum has single punctation and the surface between the punctures has a hexagonal microreticulated sculpture. The lateral margins are explanate, weakly crenulated and visible for their entire lengths from above. The elytral punctation is dual and not seriate. Males have a frontoclypeal ridge bearing a pair of converging, broadly laminar and parallel-sided horns with rounded apices, their outer margins angulated at one-third the basal length, and an abdominal sex patch of approximately one-fourth of the length of the first abdominal ventrite and located next to its posterior margin at the midline.

== Life history ==
Specimens have been collected in the Cerrado (Brazilian savanna), where they occur in Ganoderma species and Pycnoporus sanguineus. They have also been found in Trametes villosa and Hexagonia hydnoides. In Panama, they also occur in Hexagonia hydnoides.
