= Macrocis rufescens =

Scientific classification
- Kingdom: Animalia
- Phylum: Arthropoda
- Clade: Pancrustacea
- Class: Insecta
- Order: Coleoptera
- Suborder: Polyphaga
- Infraorder: Cucujiformia
- Family: Ciidae
- Genus: Macrocis
- Species: M. rufescens

Binomial name
- Macrocis rufescens Pic, 1922

Synonyms
- Cis rufescens

Species of beetle

Macrocis rufescens is a species of beetle of the family Ciidae. It is found in Guadeloupe and Trinidad and Tobago.

== Description ==
Adults reach a length of about 1.67–1.88 mm (0.066–0.074 in). The body is convex, elongated, subglabrous and reddish. The pronotum has single punctation and the surface between the punctures has a hexagonal microreticulated sculpture. The lateral margins are weakly explanate, weakly crenulated and visible for their entire lengths from above. The elytral punctation is dual and seriate. Males have a frontoclypeal ridge bearing a pair of barely converging and conical horns with acute apices and abdominal sex patch of approximately one-fourth of the length of the first abdominal ventrite, located next to the posterior margin at the midline.
