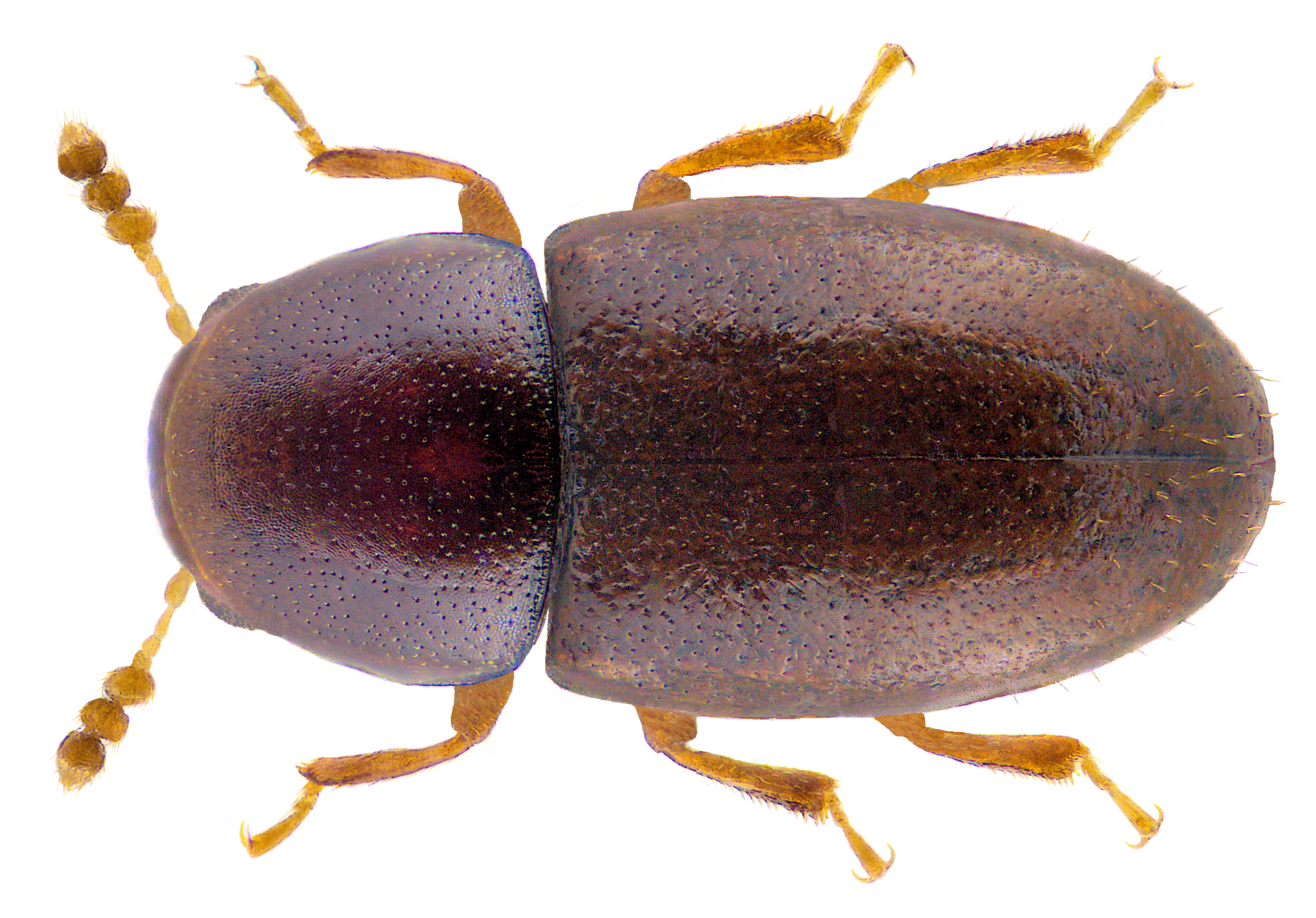

Scientific classification
- Kingdom: Animalia
- Phylum: Arthropoda
- Class: Insecta
- Order: Coleoptera
- Suborder: Polyphaga
- Infraorder: Cucujiformia
- Family: Ciidae
- Tribe: Orophiini
- Genus: Octotemnus
- Species: O. glabriculus

Binomial name
- Octotemnus glabriculus (Gyllenhal, 1827)

= Octotemnus glabriculus =

Species of beetle

Octotemnus glabriculus is a species of minute tree-fungus beetle in the family Ciidae. It is found in Europe and Northern Asia (excluding China).
