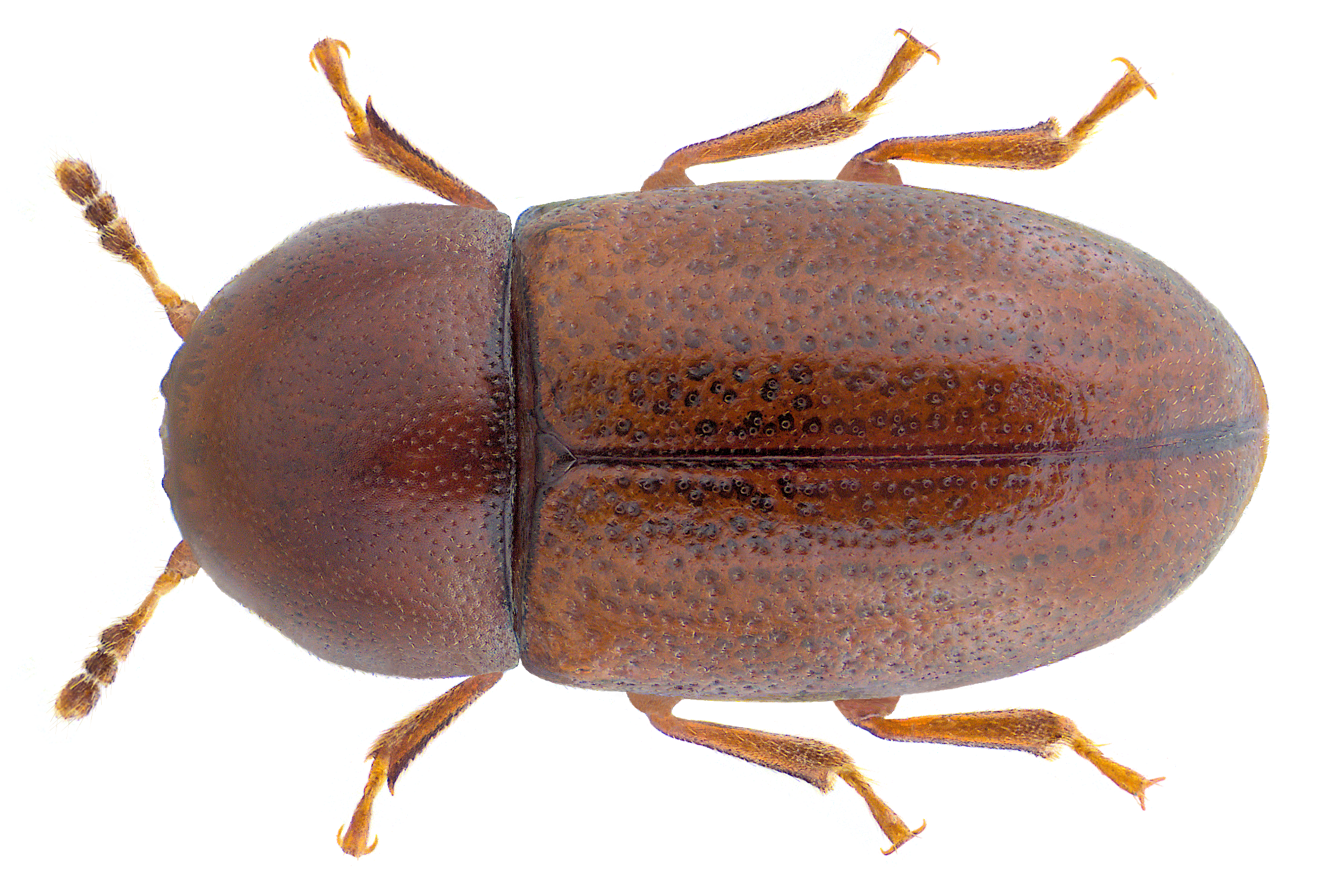

Scientific classification
- Kingdom: Animalia
- Phylum: Arthropoda
- Class: Insecta
- Order: Coleoptera
- Suborder: Polyphaga
- Infraorder: Cucujiformia
- Family: Ciidae
- Genus: Cis
- Species: C. castaneus

Binomial name
- Cis castaneus Herbst, 1793

= Cis castaneus =

Species of beetle

Cis castaneus is a species of tree-fungus beetles in the family Ciidae.

The nematode species Caenorhabditis monodelphis is a free-living species that can be found in galleries inside of the fungus Ganoderma applanatum (Polyporaceae) which grows on the stump of trees a few centimeters above ground. It is phoretic on C. castaneus.
