= Sphindocis =

Sphindocis denticollis

Scientific classification
- Kingdom: Animalia
- Phylum: Arthropoda
- Class: Insecta
- Order: Coleoptera
- Suborder: Polyphaga
- Infraorder: Cucujiformia
- Family: Ciidae
- Genus: Sphindocis; Fall, 1917
- Species: S. denticollis

Binomial name
- Sphindocis denticollis Fall, 1917

Species of beetle

Sphindocis denticollis is a species of beetle in the family Ciidae, the only species in the genus Sphindocis. Sphindocis denticollis is classified under the family Ciidae, and is the only species in its genus.
