= Macrocis setifer =

Scientific classification
- Kingdom: Animalia
- Phylum: Arthropoda
- Clade: Pancrustacea
- Class: Insecta
- Order: Coleoptera
- Suborder: Polyphaga
- Infraorder: Cucujiformia
- Family: Ciidae
- Genus: Macrocis
- Species: M. setifer

Binomial name
- Macrocis setifer Gorham, 1883

Synonyms
- Cis setifer

Species of beetle

Macrocis setifer is a species of beetle of the family Ciidae. It is found in Guatemala, Mexico (Veracruz) and Panama.

== Description ==
Adults reach a length of about 1.2–1.45 mm (0.047–0.057 in). The body is convex, rounded and compact with the dorsal vestiture consisting of short and thick yellowish setae. The pronotum has single punctation and the surface between the punctures has a hexagonal microreticulated sculpture. The lateral margins are strongly explanate, not crenulated and visible for their entire lengths from above. The elytral punctation is subseriate and dual. Males have a frontoclypeal ridge bearing a pair of slightly convergent, fine and conical horns with acute apex and abdominal sex patch of approximately two-fifths of the length of the first abdominal ventrite and located next to its posterior margin at the midline.

== Life history ==
The recorded host fungi are Ganoderma species, Hexagonia hydnoides, Rigidoporus species (including Rigidoporus microporus and Rigidoporus lineatus) and Earliella scabrosa.
