= Orthocis juglandis =

Scientific classification
- Kingdom: Animalia
- Phylum: Arthropoda
- Class: Insecta
- Order: Coleoptera
- Suborder: Polyphaga
- Infraorder: Cucujiformia
- Family: Ciidae
- Genus: Orthocis
- Species: O. juglandis

Binomial name
- Orthocis juglandis Reitter, 1885

Synonyms
- Cis juglandis Reitter, 1885

Species of beetle

Orthocis juglandis is a species of tree-fungus beetle in Ciidae family which can be found in Austria, Bosnia and Herzegovina, Kosovo, Montenegro, Serbia, and Voivodina.
