= Orthocis alnoides =

Scientific classification
- Kingdom: Animalia
- Phylum: Arthropoda
- Class: Insecta
- Order: Coleoptera
- Suborder: Polyphaga
- Infraorder: Cucujiformia
- Family: Ciidae
- Genus: Orthocis
- Species: O. alnoides

Binomial name
- Orthocis alnoides Reitter, 1884

Synonyms
- Cis alnoides Reitter, 1884

Species of beetle

Orthocis alnoides is a species of tree-fungus beetle in Ciidae family which can be found throughout Near East and Croatia.
