= Macrocis testaceus =

Scientific classification
- Kingdom: Animalia
- Phylum: Arthropoda
- Clade: Pancrustacea
- Class: Insecta
- Order: Coleoptera
- Suborder: Polyphaga
- Infraorder: Cucujiformia
- Family: Ciidae
- Genus: Macrocis
- Species: M. testaceus

Binomial name
- Macrocis testaceus Pic, 1916

Synonyms
- Cis kawanabei Lopes-Andrade, 2002

Species of beetle

Macrocis testaceus is a species of beetle of the family Ciidae. It is found in Brazil (Rio de Janeiro, Espírito Santo, Minas Gerais) and Colombia.

== Description ==
Adults reach a length of about 1.63–2.2 mm (0.064–0.087 in). The body is convex and strongly elongated with the dorsal vestiture consisting of long slender yellowish setae. The pronotum has simple punctation and the surface between the punctures is smooth. The lateral margins are explanate, crenulated and barely visible from above. The elytral punctation is dual and seriate. Males have a frontoclypeal ridge bearing a pair of converging and conical horns with acute apices and abdominal sex patch of approximately one-fourth the length of the first abdominal ventrite, located next to the posterior margin at the midline.

== Life history ==
They inhabit remnants of the Atlantic Forest and subtropical rainforests of south-eastern and southern Brazil. In Colombia it was collected in Popayan in the Cauca department occurring in Phellinus gilvus, growing on a Quercus species.
