= Aliocis =

Scientific classification
- Kingdom: Animalia
- Phylum: Arthropoda
- Class: Insecta
- Order: Coleoptera
- Suborder: Polyphaga
- Infraorder: Cucujiformia
- Family: Ciidae
- Genus: Aliocis; Sandoval-Gómez & Lopes-Andrade, 2015

Genus of beetles

Aliocis is a genus of tree-fungus beetle in the family Ciidae. It was described by Sandoval-Gómez and Lopes-Andrade in 2015, as a replacement name for the genus Anoplocis, preoccupied by a genus of true weevils.

== Species ==
- Aliocis poriae (Nakane & Nobuchi, 1955)
- Aliocis ryukyuensis (Kawanabe, 1996)
