= Malacocis =

Scientific classification
- Domain: Eukaryota
- Kingdom: Animalia
- Phylum: Arthropoda
- Class: Insecta
- Order: Coleoptera
- Suborder: Polyphaga
- Infraorder: Cucujiformia
- Family: Ciidae
- Tribe: Ciini
- Genus: Malacocis; Gorham, 1886

Genus of beetles

Malacocis is a genus of beetles in the family Ciidae, containing the following species:

- Malacocis bahiensis Pic, 1916
- Malacocis brevicollis (Casey, 1898)
- Malacocis championi Gorham, 1886
