= Wagaicis =

Scientific classification
- Domain: Eukaryota
- Kingdom: Animalia
- Phylum: Arthropoda
- Class: Insecta
- Order: Coleoptera
- Suborder: Polyphaga
- Infraorder: Cucujiformia
- Family: Ciidae
- Genus: Wagaicis; Lohse, 1964

Genus of beetles

Wagaicis is a genus of tree-fungus beetles in the family Ciidae.

== Species ==
- Wagaicis wagae Wankowicz, 1869
