= Macrocis cornelli =

Scientific classification
- Kingdom: Animalia
- Phylum: Arthropoda
- Clade: Pancrustacea
- Class: Insecta
- Order: Coleoptera
- Suborder: Polyphaga
- Infraorder: Cucujiformia
- Family: Ciidae
- Genus: Macrocis
- Species: M. cornelli

Binomial name
- Macrocis cornelli (Lawrence, 1971)

Synonyms
- Cis cornelli Lawrence, 1971

Species of beetle

Macrocis cornelli is a species of beetle of the family Ciidae. It is found in the United States (Florida, North Carolina, South Carolina).

== Description ==
Adults reach a length of about 1.3 mm (0.051 in). The body is convex and elongated with the dorsal vestiture consisting of moderately short and thick yellowish setae. The pronotum has single punctation and the surface between the punctures is finely granulate. The lateral margins are explanate, crenulated and visible for their entire lengths from above. The elytral punctation is dual and seriate.
