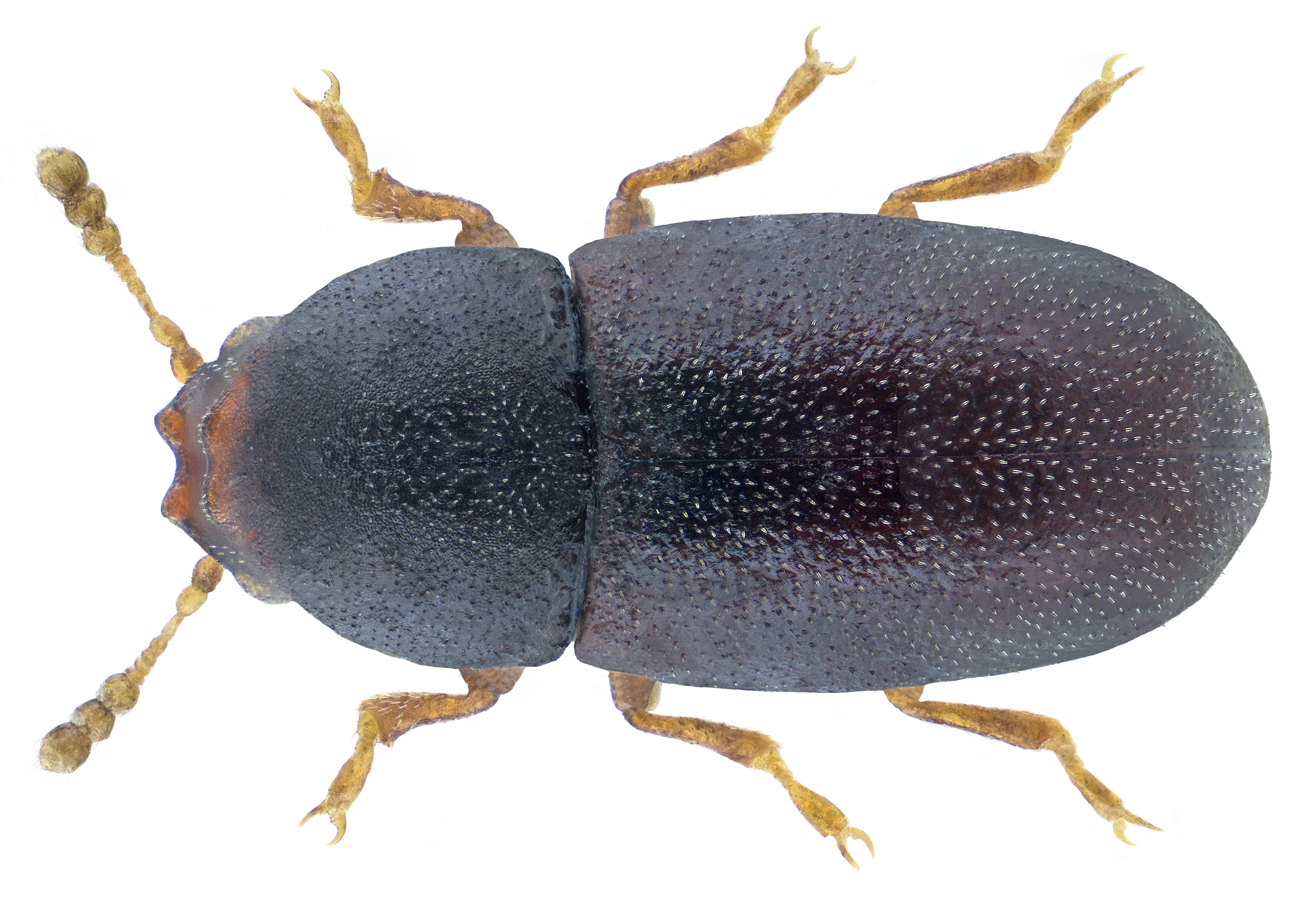
- Strigocis bicornis

Scientific classification
- Domain: Eukaryota
- Kingdom: Animalia
- Phylum: Arthropoda
- Class: Insecta
- Order: Coleoptera
- Suborder: Polyphaga
- Infraorder: Cucujiformia
- Family: Ciidae
- Tribe: Ciini
- Genus: Strigocis; Dury, 1917

= Strigocis =

Genus of beetles

Strigocis is a genus of minute tree-fungus beetles in the family Ciidae. There are at least five described species in Strigocis.

== Species ==
These five species belong to the genus Strigocis:

- Strigocis bicornis (Mellié, 1848)^{g}
- Strigocis bilimeki (Reitter, 1878)^{i c g}
- Strigocis opacicollis Dury, 1917^{i c g b}
- Strigocis opalescens (Casey, 1898)^{i c g}
- Strigocis tokunagai Nobuchi, 1960

Data sources: i = ITIS, c = Catalogue of Life, g = GBIF, b = Bugguide.net
