= Tropicis =

Scientific classification
- Domain: Eukaryota
- Kingdom: Animalia
- Phylum: Arthropoda
- Class: Insecta
- Order: Coleoptera
- Suborder: Polyphaga
- Infraorder: Cucujiformia
- Family: Ciidae
- Genus: Tropicis; Scott, 1926

Genus of beetles

Tropicis is a genus of beetles in the family Ciidae, containing the following species:

- Tropicis brevicarinatus Scott, 1926
- Tropicis flexicarinatus Scott, 1926
- Tropicis sexcarinatus (Waterhouse, 1876)
