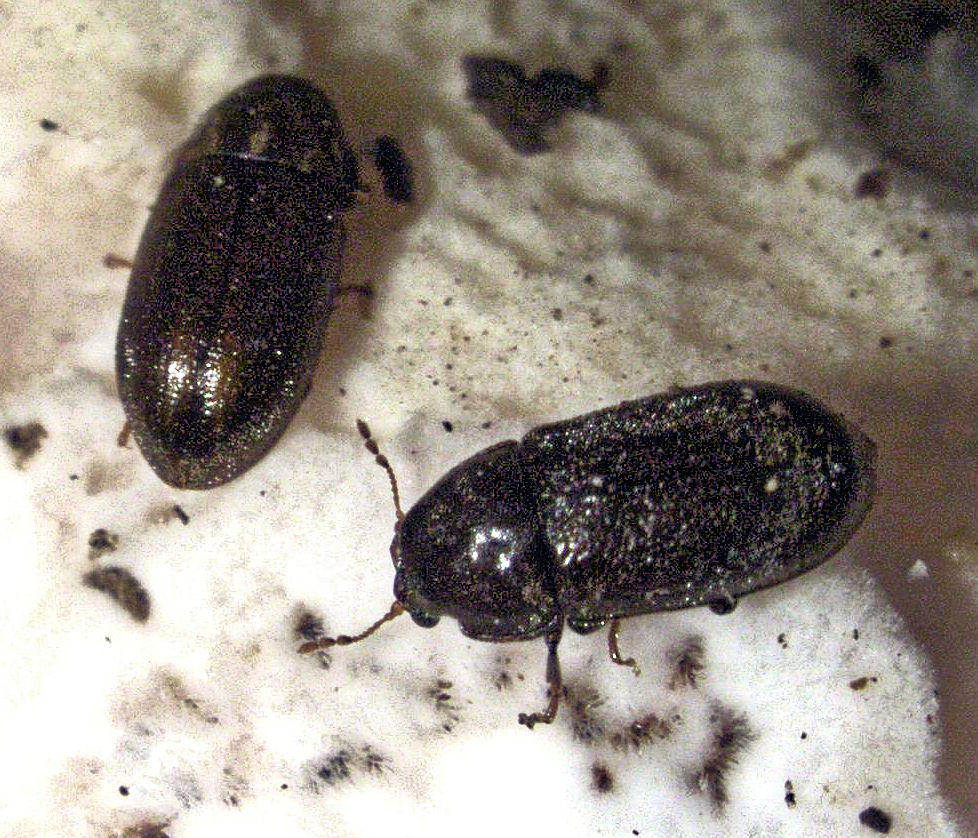
- Cis boleti on fungus

Scientific classification
- Kingdom: Animalia
- Phylum: Arthropoda
- Class: Insecta
- Order: Coleoptera
- Suborder: Polyphaga
- Infraorder: Cucujiformia
- Family: Ciidae
- Genus: Cis
- Species: C. boleti

Binomial name
- Cis boleti (Scopoli, 1763)

= Cis boleti =

Species of beetle

Cis boleti is a species of beetle in family Ciidae. Cis boleti is a tiny beetle (2,8–4 mm in length) uniformly brown beetle which lives in tree fungus. For instance, within the fruit bodies of Piptoporus betulinus and Trametes. It is one of many very similar species, which are very difficult to identify and separated mostly by differences in the male genitalia.. It is found in Europe and East across the Palearctic to Japan.
