= Macrocis bahiensis =

Scientific classification
- Kingdom: Animalia
- Phylum: Arthropoda
- Clade: Pancrustacea
- Class: Insecta
- Order: Coleoptera
- Suborder: Polyphaga
- Infraorder: Cucujiformia
- Family: Ciidae
- Genus: Macrocis
- Species: M. bahiensis

Binomial name
- Macrocis bahiensis (Pic, 1916)

Synonyms
- Malacocis bahiensis Pic, 1916; Cis bahiensis

Species of beetle

Macrocis bahiensis is a species of beetle of the family Ciidae. It is found in Brazil (Bahia).

== Description ==
Adults reach a length of about 1.3 mm (0.051 in). The body is convex and rounded with the dorsal vestiture consisting of long and slender yellowish setae. The pronotum is much wider than long. The punctation is single and the surface between the punctures is microreticulated. The lateral margins are explanate and not crenulated. The elytral punctation is single and not seriate.
