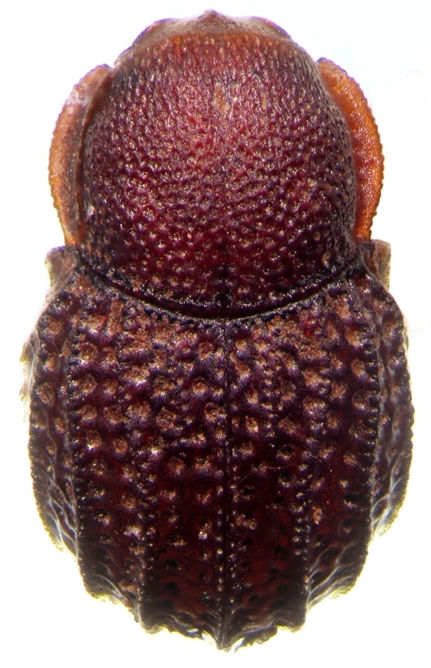
- Syncosmetus japonicus

Scientific classification
- Kingdom: Animalia
- Phylum: Arthropoda
- Class: Insecta
- Order: Coleoptera
- Suborder: Polyphaga
- Infraorder: Cucujiformia
- Family: Ciidae
- Genus: Syncosmetus; Sharp, 1891

= Syncosmetus =

Genus of beetles

Syncosmetus is a genus of tree-fungus beetles in the family Ciidae.

== Species ==
- Syncosmetus japonicus Sharp, 1891
