= Macrocis =

Scientific classification
- Kingdom: Animalia
- Phylum: Arthropoda
- Clade: Pancrustacea
- Class: Insecta
- Order: Coleoptera
- Suborder: Polyphaga
- Infraorder: Cucujiformia
- Superfamily: Tenebrionoidea
- Family: Ciidae
- Genus: Macrocis; Reitter, 1878

Synonyms
- Trichapus Friedenreich, 1881

Genus of beetles

Macrocis is a genus of beetles of the family Ciidae.

== Species ==
- Macrocis bahiensis (Pic, 1916)
- Macrocis cornelli (Lawrence, 1971)
- Macrocis diabolicus Reitter, 1878
- Macrocis grandicornis Pic, 1917
- Macrocis longipilis (Pic, 1930)
- Macrocis monnei Lopes-Andrade, Souza-Gonçalves & Sandoval-Gómez, 2026
- Macrocis pubescens (Friedenreich, 1881)
- Macrocis rufescens Pic, 1922
- Macrocis setifer Gorham, 1883
- Macrocis taurus Reitter, 1878
- Macrocis testaceimembris Pic, 1916
- Macrocis testaceus Pic, 1916 (= Cis kawanabei Lopes-Andrade, 2002)

== Taxonomy ==
The genus was previously treated as a synonym of Cis, but reinstated in 2026 to accommodate the species previously placed in the Cis taurus species group.
