= Grossicis =

Scientific classification
- Domain: Eukaryota
- Kingdom: Animalia
- Phylum: Arthropoda
- Class: Insecta
- Order: Coleoptera
- Suborder: Polyphaga
- Infraorder: Cucujiformia
- Family: Ciidae
- Genus: Grossicis; Antunes-Carvalho, Sandoval-Gómez & Lopes-Andrade, 2012

Genus of beetles

Grossicis is a genus of tree-fungus beetle in the family Ciidae.

== Species ==
- Grossicis diadematus (Mellié, 1849)
- Grossicis laminicornis Antunes-Carvalho, Sandoval-Gómez & Lopes-Andrade, 2012
