= Caenorhabditis monodelphis =

Scientific classification
- Domain: Eukaryota
- Kingdom: Animalia
- Phylum: Nematoda
- Class: Chromadorea
- Order: Rhabditida
- Family: Rhabditidae
- Genus: Caenorhabditis
- Species: C. monodelphis

Binomial name
- Caenorhabditis monodelphis Dieter Slos, Walter Sudhaus, Lewis Stevens, Wim Bert & Mark Blaxter, 2017

Strains
- KK-2011; SB341; JU1667

Synonyms
- Caenorhabditis sp. 1

Species of roundworm

Caenorhabditis monodelphis is a species of nematodes in the genus Caenorhabditis. It was first collected by J. Raschka in Berlin, Germany in 2001. A second isolate was collected from Norway. It is a free-living species found in galleries inside of the fungus Ganoderma applanatum (Polyporaceae) which grew on the stump of a tree a few centimeters above ground. It is phoretic on beetles of the species Cis castaneus.

C. monodelphis (C. sp. 1) groups with Caenorhabditis plicata outside either the 'Drosophilae' or the 'Elegans' supergroups in phylogenetic studies. Its genome was sequenced by the Edinburgh Genomics Facility, University of Edinburgh.

Several strains are known and kept in labs. Strain SB341 can be maintained on OP50 E. coli plates.
