= Hyalocis =

Scientific classification
- Domain: Eukaryota
- Kingdom: Animalia
- Phylum: Arthropoda
- Class: Insecta
- Order: Coleoptera
- Suborder: Polyphaga
- Infraorder: Cucujiformia
- Family: Ciidae
- Genus: Hyalocis; Kawanabe, 1993

Genus of beetles

Hyalocis is a genus of tree-fungus beetles in the family Ciidae.

== Species ==
- Hyalocis yakushimensis Kawanabe, 1993
