= Odontocis =

Scientific classification
- Domain: Eukaryota
- Kingdom: Animalia
- Phylum: Arthropoda
- Class: Insecta
- Order: Coleoptera
- Suborder: Polyphaga
- Infraorder: Cucujiformia
- Family: Ciidae
- Genus: Odontocis; Nakane & Nobuchi, 1955

Genus of beetles

Odontocis is a genus of tree-fungus beetles in the family Ciidae.

== Species ==
- Odontocis denticollis Nakane & Nobuchi, 1955
