= Rhopalodontus =

Scientific classification
- Kingdom: Animalia
- Phylum: Arthropoda
- Class: Insecta
- Order: Coleoptera
- Suborder: Polyphaga
- Infraorder: Cucujiformia
- Family: Ciidae
- Subfamily: Ciinae
- Genus: Rhopalodontus; Mellié, 1847

Genus of beetles

Ropalodontus is a genus of tree-fungus beetles in the family Ciidae.

== Species ==
- Ropalodontus armifrons Reitter, 1913
- Ropalodontus baudueri Abeille de Perrin, 1874
- Ropalodontus camelus Abeille de Perrin, 1876
- Ropalodontus harmandi Lesne, 1917
- Ropalodontus novorossicus Reitter, 1901
- Ropalodontus perforatus Gyllenhal, 1813
- Ropalodontus perrini Reitter, 1878
- Ropalodontus populi C. & H. Brisout de Barneville, 1877
- Ropalodontus strandi Lohse, 1969
