= Scolytocis =

Scolytocis samoensis

Scientific classification
- Kingdom: Animalia
- Phylum: Arthropoda
- Class: Insecta
- Order: Coleoptera
- Suborder: Polyphaga
- Infraorder: Cucujiformia
- Family: Ciidae
- Genus: Scolytocis; Blair, 1928
- Species: S. samoensis

Binomial name
- Scolytocis samoensis Blair, 1928

Species of beetle

Scolytocis samoensis is a species of beetle in the family Ciidae, the only species in the genus Scolytocis.
