= Paratrichapus =

Paratrichapus sechellarum

Scientific classification
- Kingdom: Animalia
- Phylum: Arthropoda
- Class: Insecta
- Order: Coleoptera
- Suborder: Polyphaga
- Infraorder: Cucujiformia
- Family: Ciidae
- Genus: Paratrichapus; Scott, 1926
- Species: P. sechellarum

Binomial name
- Paratrichapus sechellarum Scott, 1926

Species of beetle

Paratrichapus sechellarum is a species of beetle in the family Ciidae, the only species in the genus Paratrichapus.
