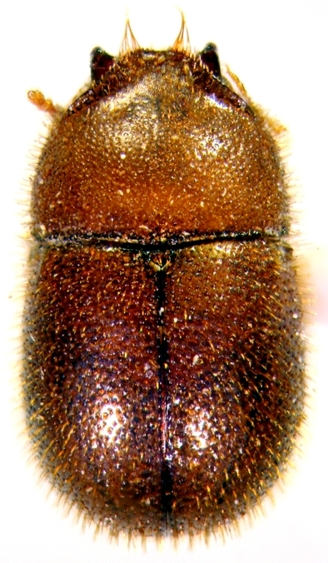

Scientific classification
- Kingdom: Animalia
- Phylum: Arthropoda
- Class: Insecta
- Order: Coleoptera
- Suborder: Polyphaga
- Infraorder: Cucujiformia
- Family: Ciidae
- Genus: Falsocis; Pic, 1916

= Falsocis =

Genus of beetles

Falsocis is a genus of beetles in the family Ciidae, containing the following species:

- Falsocis brasiliensis Lopes-Andrade, 2007
- Falsocis flavus Pic, 1922
- Falsocis opacus Pic, 1916
