= Xylographus =

Scientific classification
- Domain: Eukaryota
- Kingdom: Animalia
- Phylum: Arthropoda
- Class: Insecta
- Order: Coleoptera
- Suborder: Polyphaga
- Infraorder: Cucujiformia
- Family: Ciidae
- Genus: Xylographus; Mellié, 1849

Genus of beetles

Xylographus is a genus of tree-fungus beetles in the family Ciidae.

== Species ==
The genus contains the following species:

- Xylographus anthracinus Mellié, 1849
- Xylographus bicolor Pic, 1916
- Xylographus bostrichoides (Dufour, 1843)
- Xylographus brasiliensis Pic, 1916
- Xylographus bynoei Blair, 1940
- Xylographus ceylonicus Ancey, 1876
- Xylographys contractus Mellié, 1849
- Xylographus corpulentus Mellié, 1849
- Xylographus gibbus Mellié, 1849
- Xylographus globipennis Reitter, 1911
- Xylographus hypocritus Mellié, 1849
- Xylographus javanus Pic, 1937
- Xylographus lemoulti Pic, 1916
- Xylographus longicollis Pic, 1922
- Xylographus lucasi Lopes-Andrade & Zacaro, 2003
- Xylographus madagascariensis Mellié, 1849
- Xylographus nitidissimus Pic, 1916
- Xylographus perforatus Gerstaecker, 1871
- Xylographus porcus Gorham, 1886
- Xylographus punctatus Mellié, 1849
- Xylographus richardi Mellié, 1849
- Xylographus ritsemai Pic, 1921
- Xylographus rufescens Pic, 1921
- Xylographus rufipennis Pic, 1934
- Xylographus rufipes Pic, 1930
- Xylographus scheerpeltzi Nobuchi & Wada, 1956
- Xylographus seychellensis Scott, 1926
- Xylographus subopacus Pic, 1929
- Xylographus subsinuatus Pic, 1916
- Xylographus suillus Gorham, 1886
- Xylographus tarsalis Fahraeus, 1871
- Xylographus testaceitarsis Pic, 1916
- Xylographus tomicoides Reitter, 1901
