= Ceracis =

Scientific classification
- Domain: Eukaryota
- Kingdom: Animalia
- Phylum: Arthropoda
- Class: Insecta
- Order: Coleoptera
- Suborder: Polyphaga
- Infraorder: Cucujiformia
- Family: Ciidae
- Tribe: Ciini
- Genus: Ceracis; Mellié, 1848

Genus of beetles

Ceracis is a genus of tree-fungus beetle in the family Ciidae.

== Species ==
These 28 species belong to the genus Ceracis:

- Ceracis californicus (Casey, 1884)^{i c g b}
- Ceracis castaneipennis (Mellié, 1848)^{g}
- Ceracis cucullatus (Mellié, 1849)^{g}
- Ceracis curtus (Mellié, 1848)^{i c g}
- Ceracis dixiensis (Tanner, 1934)^{i c g}
- Ceracis furcifer Mellié, 1849^{g}
- Ceracis japonus Reitter, 1878
- Ceracis laminicollis Miyatake, 1982^{g}
- Ceracis laticornis Pic, 1922^{g}
- Ceracis magister Lawrence, 1971^{i c g}
- Ceracis minutissimus (Mellié, 1848)^{i c g}
- Ceracis minutus Dury, 1917^{i c g}
- Ceracis monocerus Lawrence, 1967^{i c g}
- Ceracis multipunctatus (Mellié, 1848)^{i c g}
- Ceracis nigropunctatus Lawrence, 1967^{i c g b}
- Ceracis obrieni Lawrence, 1967^{i c g}
- Ceracis particularis Pic, 1922^{g}
- Ceracis pecki Lawrence, 1971^{i c g}
- Ceracis powelli Lawrence, 1967^{i c g}
- Ceracis pullulus (Casey, 1898)^{i c g}
- Ceracis punctulatus Casey, 1898^{i c g}
- Ceracis quadricornis Gorham, 1886^{i c g}
- Ceracis quadridentatus Pic, 1922^{g}
- Ceracis sallei (Mellié, 1848)^{i c g}
- Ceracis schaefferi Dury, 1917^{i c g}
- Ceracis shikokuensis Miyatake, 1954
- Ceracis singularis (Dury, 1917)^{i c g b}
- Ceracis thoracicornis (Ziegler, 1845)^{i c g b}

Data sources: i = ITIS, c = Catalogue of Life, g = GBIF, b = Bugguide.net
