= Neoapterocis =

Scientific classification
- Domain: Eukaryota
- Kingdom: Animalia
- Phylum: Arthropoda
- Class: Insecta
- Order: Coleoptera
- Suborder: Polyphaga
- Infraorder: Cucujiformia
- Family: Ciidae
- Genus: Neoapterocis; Lopes-Andrade, 2007

Genus of beetles

Neoapterocis is a genus of beetles in the family Ciidae, containing the following species:

- Neoapterocis chilensis Lopes-Andrade, 2007
- Neoapterocis mexicanus Lopes-Andrade, 2007
