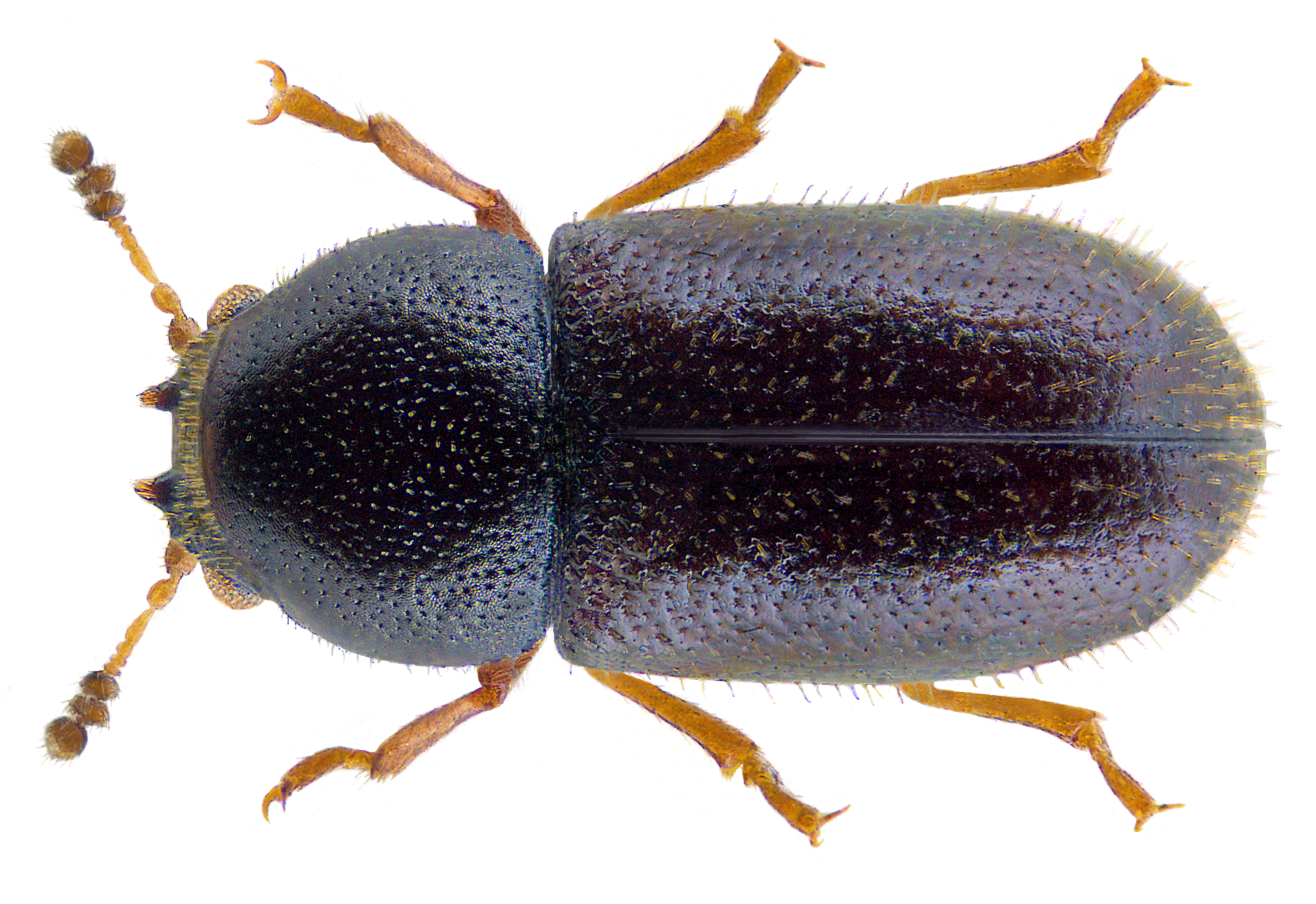
- Sulcacis nitidus

Scientific classification
- Domain: Eukaryota
- Kingdom: Animalia
- Phylum: Arthropoda
- Class: Insecta
- Order: Coleoptera
- Suborder: Polyphaga
- Infraorder: Cucujiformia
- Family: Ciidae
- Tribe: Ciini
- Genus: Sulcacis; Dury, 1917

Synonyms
- Entypocis Lohse, 1964

= Sulcacis =

Genus of beetles

Sulcacis is a genus of tree-fungus beetles in the family Ciidae.

== Species ==
These eight species belong to the genus Sulcacis:

- Sulcacis affinis (Gyllenhal, 1827)^{g}
- Sulcacis bidentulus (Rosenhauer, 1847)^{g}
- Sulcacis curtulus (Casey, 1898)^{i c g b}
- Sulcacis fronticornis (Panzer, 1809)^{g}
- Sulcacis japonicus Nobuchi, 1960
- Sulcacis lengi Dury, 1917^{i c g b}
- Sulcacis nitidus (Fabricius, 1792)^{g}
- Sulcacis nobuchii Kawanabe, 1997

Data sources: i = ITIS, c = Catalogue of Life, g = GBIF, b = Bugguide.net
