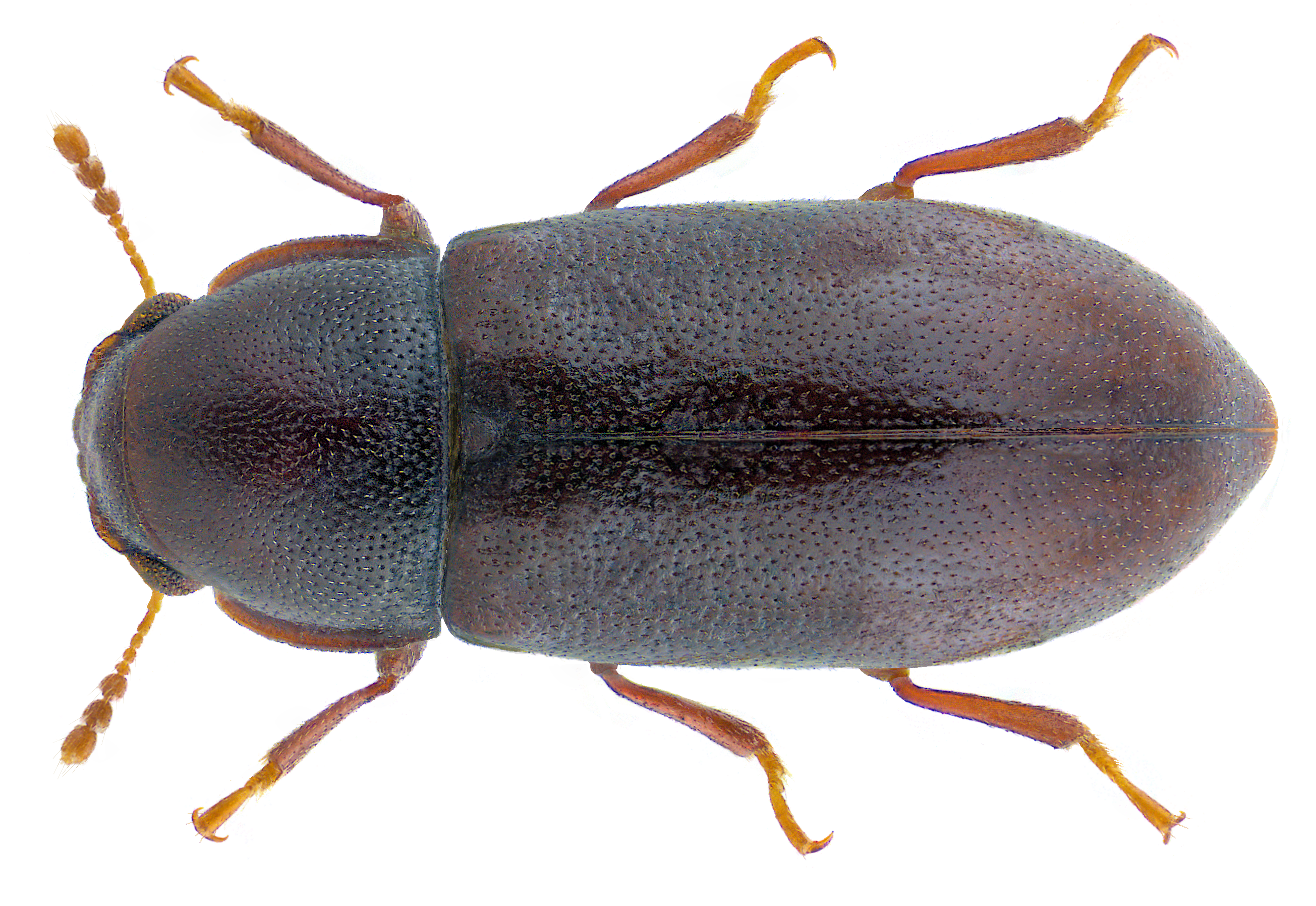
- Orthocis alni

Scientific classification
- Kingdom: Animalia
- Phylum: Arthropoda
- Class: Insecta
- Order: Coleoptera
- Suborder: Polyphaga
- Infraorder: Cucujiformia
- Family: Ciidae
- Tribe: Ciini
- Genus: Orthocis; Casey, 1898

= Orthocis =

Genus of beetles

Orthocis is a genus of tree-fungus beetles in the family Ciidae.

== Species ==
These 27 species belong to the genus Orthocis:

- Orthocis alni (Gyllenhal, 1813)^{g}
- Orthocis alnoides (Reitter, 1884)^{g}
- Orthocis auriculariae Lawrence, 1991
- Orthocis collenettei (Blair, 1927)^{g}
- Orthocis coluber (Abeille, 1874)^{g}
- Orthocis festivus (Panzer, 1793)^{g}
- Orthocis huesanus Kraus, 1908^{i c g}
- Orthocis insularis Waterhouse, 1876^{g}
- Orthocis ishiharai Kawanabe, 1994
- Orthocis juglandis (Reitter, 1885)^{g}
- Orthocis linearis (J.Sahlberg, 1900)^{g}
- Orthocis longulus Dury, 1917^{i c g}
- Orthocis lucasi (Abeille de Perrin, 1874)^{g}
- Orthocis nigrosplendidus Nobuchi, 1955
- Orthocis ornatus Reitter, 1877
- Orthocis perrisi (Abeille de Perrin, 1874)^{g}
- Orthocis pseudolinearis Lohse, 1965^{g}
- Orthocis pulcher Kraus, 1908^{i c g}
- Orthocis punctatus (Mellié, 1848)^{i c g b}
- Orthocis pygmaeus (Marsham, 1802)^{g}
- Orthocis sagittiferus (Israelsson, 1980)^{g}
- Orthocis schizophylli Nakane & Nobuchi, 1955
- Orthocis sublacernatus (Scott, 1926)^{g}
- Orthocis testaceofasciatus (Pic, 1922)^{g}
- Orthocis transversatus (Kraus, 1908)^{i c g b}
- Orthocis vestitus (Mellié, 1848)^{g}
- Orthocis zoufali (Reitter, 1902)^{g}

Data sources: i = ITIS, c = Catalogue of Life, g = GBIF, b = Bugguide.net
