= Acanthocis =

Scientific classification
- Domain: Eukaryota
- Kingdom: Animalia
- Phylum: Arthropoda
- Class: Insecta
- Order: Coleoptera
- Suborder: Polyphaga
- Infraorder: Cucujiformia
- Family: Ciidae
- Genus: Acanthocis; Miyatake, 1954

Genus of insects

Acanthocis is a genus of tree-fungus beetles in the family Ciidae.

== Species ==
- Acanthocis inonoti Miyatake, 1955
- Acanthocis quadridentatus Nobuchi & Wada, 1959
