= Nipponapterocis =

Scientific classification
- Domain: Eukaryota
- Kingdom: Animalia
- Phylum: Arthropoda
- Class: Insecta
- Order: Coleoptera
- Suborder: Polyphaga
- Infraorder: Cucujiformia
- Family: Ciidae
- Genus: Nipponapterocis; Miyatake, 1954

Genus of beetles

Nipponapterocis is a genus of tree-fungus beetles in the family Ciidae.

== Species ==
- Nipponapterocis brevis Miyatake, 1954
- Nipponapterocis hirsutus Kawanabe, 1995
- Nipponapterocis inermis Kawanabe, 1995
