= Dichodontocis =

Scientific classification
- Domain: Eukaryota
- Kingdom: Animalia
- Phylum: Arthropoda
- Class: Insecta
- Order: Coleoptera
- Suborder: Polyphaga
- Infraorder: Cucujiformia
- Family: Ciidae
- Genus: Dichodontocis; Kawanabe, 1994

Genus of beetles

Dichodontocis is a genus of tree-fungus beetle in the family Ciidae

== Species ==
- Dichodontocis uncinatus Kawanabe, 1994
