= Atlantocis =

Scientific classification
- Domain: Eukaryota
- Kingdom: Animalia
- Phylum: Arthropoda
- Class: Insecta
- Order: Coleoptera
- Suborder: Polyphaga
- Infraorder: Cucujiformia
- Family: Ciidae
- Genus: Atlantocis; Israelson, 1985

Genus of beetles

Atlantocis is a genus of tree-fungus beetle in the family Ciidae.

== Species ==
- Atlantocis canariensis Israelson, 1985
- Atlantocis gillerforsi Israelson, 1985
- Atlantocis lauri Wollaston, 1854
