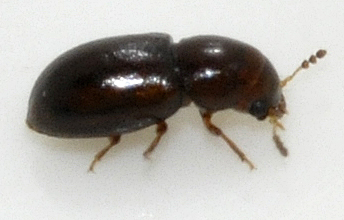
- Octotemnus glabriculus

Scientific classification
- Domain: Eukaryota
- Kingdom: Animalia
- Phylum: Arthropoda
- Class: Insecta
- Order: Coleoptera
- Suborder: Polyphaga
- Infraorder: Cucujiformia
- Family: Ciidae
- Tribe: Orophiini
- Genus: Octotemnus; Mellié, 1847

= Octotemnus =

Genus of beetles

Octotemnus is a genus of tree-fungus beetles in the family Ciidae.

== Species ==
- Octotemnus aculeatus Kawanabe, 2002
- Octotemnus chinensis J.-K. Li, 1992
- Octotemnus glabriculus Gyllenhal, 1827
- Octotemnus japonicus Mityatake, 1954
- Octotemnus laminifrons Motschulsky, 1861
- Octotemnus mandibularis Gyllenhal, 1813
- Octotemnus michiochujoi Kawanabe, 2005
- Octotemnus omogensis Miyatake, 1954
- Octotemnus opacus Mellié, 1848
- Octotemnus parvulus Miyatake, 1954
- Octotemnus pilosoceps Kawanabe, 2002
- Octotemnus punctidorsum Miyatake, 1954
- Octotemnus robustus Kawanabe, 2002
- Octotemnus rugosopunctatus Drogvalenko, 2002
