= Porculus =

Scientific classification
- Domain: Eukaryota
- Kingdom: Animalia
- Phylum: Arthropoda
- Class: Insecta
- Order: Coleoptera
- Suborder: Polyphaga
- Infraorder: Cucujiformia
- Family: Ciidae
- Genus: Porculus; Lawrence, 1987

Genus of beetles

Porculus is a genus of beetles in the family Ciidae, containing the following species:

- Porculus brunneus (Mellié, 1849)
- Porculus dufoui (Pic, 1922)
- Porculus grossus Lawrence, 1987
- Porculus piceus (Mellié, 1849)
- Porculus vianai (Pic, 1940)
