= Polynesicis =

Polynesicis hirsutus

Scientific classification
- Kingdom: Animalia
- Phylum: Arthropoda
- Class: Insecta
- Order: Coleoptera
- Suborder: Polyphaga
- Infraorder: Cucujiformia
- Family: Ciidae
- Genus: Polynesicis; Zimmerman, 1938
- Species: P. hirsutus

Binomial name
- Polynesicis hirsutus Zimmerman, 1938

Species of beetle

Polynesicis hirsutus is a species of beetles in the family Ciidae, the only species in the genus Polynesicis.
