= Dimerapterocis =

Dimerapterocis apterus

Scientific classification
- Domain: Eukaryota
- Kingdom: Animalia
- Phylum: Arthropoda
- Class: Insecta
- Order: Coleoptera
- Suborder: Polyphaga
- Infraorder: Cucujiformia
- Family: Ciidae
- Genus: Dimerapterocis; Scott, 1926
- Species: D. apterus

Binomial name
- Dimerapterocis apterus Scott, 1926

Species of beetle

Dimerapterocis apterus is a species of beetle in the family Ciidae and the only species in the genus Dimerapterocis.
