= Phellinocis =

Scientific classification
- Domain: Eukaryota
- Kingdom: Animalia
- Phylum: Arthropoda
- Class: Insecta
- Order: Coleoptera
- Suborder: Polyphaga
- Infraorder: Cucujiformia
- Family: Ciidae
- Genus: Phellinocis; Lopes-Andrade & Lawrence, 2005

Genus of beetles

Phellinocis is a genus of beetles in the family Ciidae, containing the following species:

- Phellinocis erwini Lopes-Andrade & Lawrence, 2005
- Phellinocis romualdoi Lopes-Andrade & Lawrence, 2005
- Phellinocis thayeri Lopes-Andrade & Lawrence, 2005
