= Apterocis =

Scientific classification
- Domain: Eukaryota
- Kingdom: Animalia
- Phylum: Arthropoda
- Class: Insecta
- Order: Coleoptera
- Suborder: Polyphaga
- Infraorder: Cucujiformia
- Family: Ciidae
- Genus: Apterocis; Perkins, 1900

Genus of beetles

Apterocis is a genus of beetles in the family Ciidae, containing the following species:

- Apterocis ephistemoides (Sharp in Blackburn & Sharp, 1885)
- Apterocis hawaiiensis Perkins, 1900
- Apterocis hystrix Perkins, 1900
- Apterocis impunctatus Perkins, 1900
- Apterocis laiaiensis Perkins, 1900
- Apterocis minor Perkins, 1900
- Apterocis montanus Perkins, 1900
- Apterocis ornatipennis Perkins, 1900
- Apterocis rufonotatus Perkins, 1900
- Apterocis strigosus Perkins, 1900
- Apterocis subaeneus Perkins, 1900
- Apterocis vagepunctatus (Blackburn in Blackburn & Sharp, 1885)
- Apterocis variabilis Perkins, 1900
- Apterocis variegatus Perkins, 1900
