= Diphyllocis =

Scientific classification
- Kingdom: Animalia
- Phylum: Arthropoda
- Class: Insecta
- Order: Coleoptera
- Suborder: Polyphaga
- Infraorder: Cucujiformia
- Family: Ciidae
- Genus: Diphyllocis; Reitter, 1885

Genus of beetles

Diphyllocis is a genus of tree-fungus beetle in the family Ciidae.

== Species ==
- Diphyllocis opaculus Reitter, 1885
