= Plesiocis =

Plesiocis cribrum

Scientific classification
- Kingdom: Animalia
- Phylum: Arthropoda
- Class: Insecta
- Order: Coleoptera
- Suborder: Polyphaga
- Infraorder: Cucujiformia
- Family: Ciidae
- Genus: Plesiocis; Casey, 1898
- Species: P. cribrum

Binomial name
- Plesiocis cribrum Casey, 1898

Species of beetle

Plesiocis cribrum is a species of beetle in the family Ciidae, the only species in the genus Plesiocis.
