= Anoplocis =

Scientific classification
- Kingdom: Animalia
- Phylum: Arthropoda
- Class: Insecta
- Order: Coleoptera
- Suborder: Polyphaga
- Infraorder: Cucujiformia
- Family: Curculionidae
- Genus: Anoplocis; Lea, 1913
- Species: A. ferrugineus

Binomial name
- Anoplocis ferrugineus Lea, 1913

Genus of beetles

Anoplocis is a genus of true weevils in the family Curculionidae. It contains a single species, Anoplocis ferrugineus, native to Australia. The genus and species were first described by Arthur Mills Lea in 1913.
