= Ennearthron =

Scientific classification
- Domain: Eukaryota
- Kingdom: Animalia
- Phylum: Arthropoda
- Class: Insecta
- Order: Coleoptera
- Suborder: Polyphaga
- Infraorder: Cucujiformia
- Family: Ciidae
- Genus: Ennearthron; Mellié, 1847

Genus of beetles

Ennearthron is a genus of tree-fungus beetles in the family Ciidae.

== Species ==
- Ennearthron abeillei Caillol, 1914
- Ennearthron amamense Miyatake, 1959
- Ennearthron chujoi Nakane & Nobuchi, 1955
- Ennearthron cornutum Gyllenhal, 1827
- Ennearthron filum Abeille de Perrin, 1874
- Ennearthron hayashii Nobuchi, 1955
- Ennearthron ishiharai Miyatake, 1954
- Ennearthron mohrii Miyatake, 1954
- Ennearthron ondreji Roubal, 1919
- Ennearthron palmi Lohse, 1966
- Ennearthron pruinosulum Perris, 1864
- Ennearthron reichei Abeille de Perrin, 1874
- Ennearthron reitteri Flach, 1882
- Ennearthron robusticorne Kawanabe, 1996
