= Dolichocis =

Scientific classification
- Domain: Eukaryota
- Kingdom: Animalia
- Phylum: Arthropoda
- Class: Insecta
- Order: Coleoptera
- Suborder: Polyphaga
- Infraorder: Cucujiformia
- Family: Ciidae
- Genus: Dolichocis; Dury, 1919

Genus of beetles

Dolichocis is a genus of tree-fungus beetle in the family Ciidae.

== Species ==
- Dolichocis laricinus Mellié, 1848
- Dolichocis yuasai M. Chûjô, 1941
