= Nipponocis =

Scientific classification
- Domain: Eukaryota
- Kingdom: Animalia
- Phylum: Arthropoda
- Class: Insecta
- Order: Coleoptera
- Suborder: Polyphaga
- Infraorder: Cucujiformia
- Family: Ciidae
- Genus: Nipponocis; Nobuchi & Wada, 1955

Genus of beetles

Nipponocis is a genus of tree-fungus beetles in the family Ciidae.

== Species ==
- Nipponocis ashuensis Nobuchi, 1959
- Nipponocis longisetosus Nobuchi, 1955
- Nipponocis magnus Nobuchi, 1955
- Nipponocis unipunctatus Nakane & Nobuchi, 1956
