= Hadreule =

Scientific classification
- Domain: Eukaryota
- Kingdom: Animalia
- Phylum: Arthropoda
- Class: Insecta
- Order: Coleoptera
- Suborder: Polyphaga
- Infraorder: Cucujiformia
- Family: Ciidae
- Genus: Hadreule

Genus of beetles

Hadreule is a genus of tree-fungus beetle in the family Ciidae.

== Species ==
- Hadreule blaisdelli (Casey, 1900)
- Hadreule elongatulum (Gyllenhal, 1827)
- Hadreule explanata Lawrence, 1971
