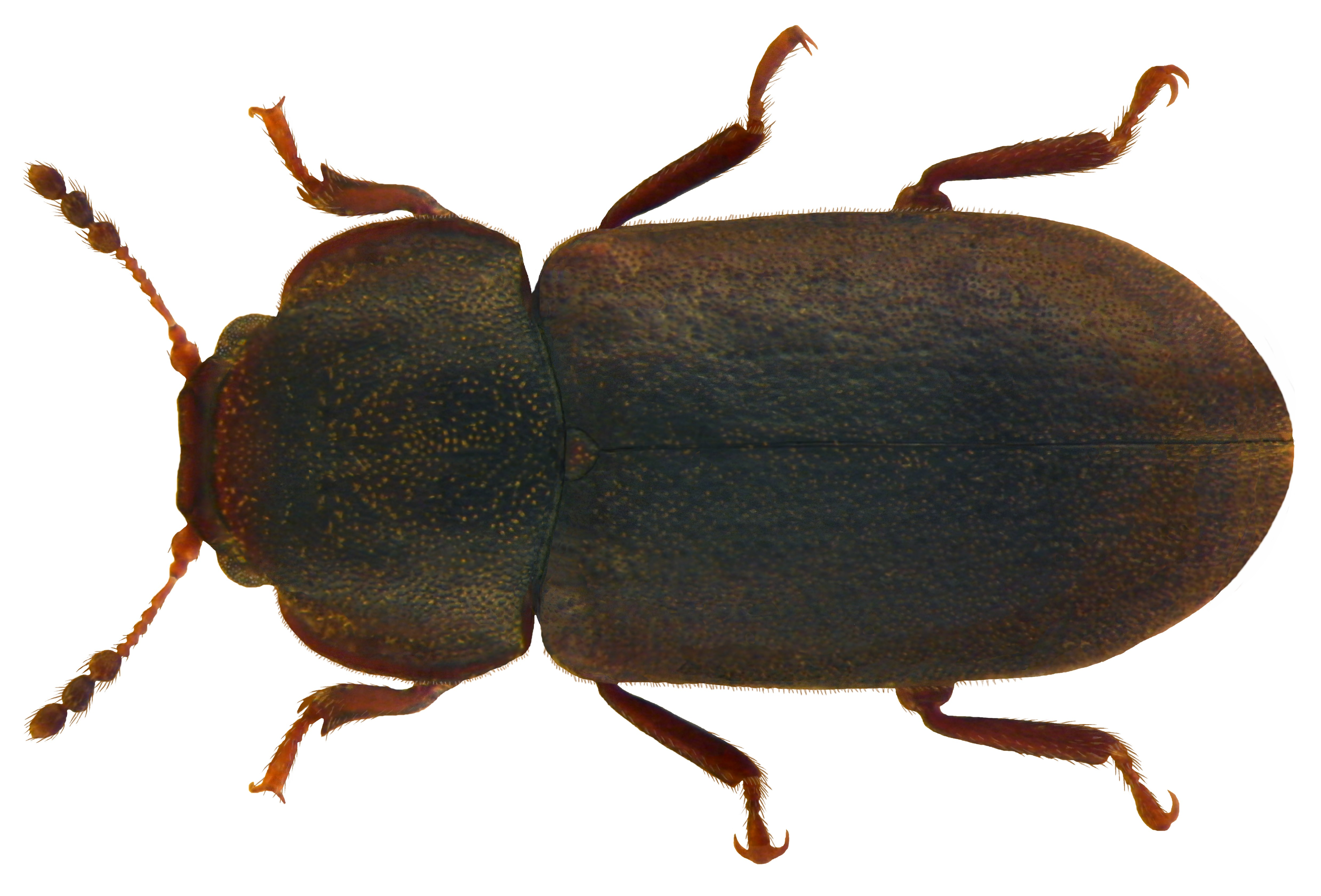
- Cis boleti

Scientific classification
- Kingdom: Animalia
- Phylum: Arthropoda
- Clade: Pancrustacea
- Class: Insecta
- Order: Coleoptera
- Suborder: Polyphaga
- Infraorder: Cucujiformia
- Family: Ciidae
- Subfamily: Ciinae
- Genus: Cis; Latreille, 1796

Type species
- Dermestes boleti Scopoli, 1763

Synonyms
- Eridaulus Thomson, 1863; Cisdygma Reitter, 1885; Trichapus Friedenreich, 1881; Macrocis Reitter, 1878; Xestocis Casey, 1898

= Cis (beetle) =

Genus of beetles

Cis is a genus of tree-fungus beetles in the family Ciidae. There are at least 150 described species in Cis.

== See also ==
- List of Cis species
