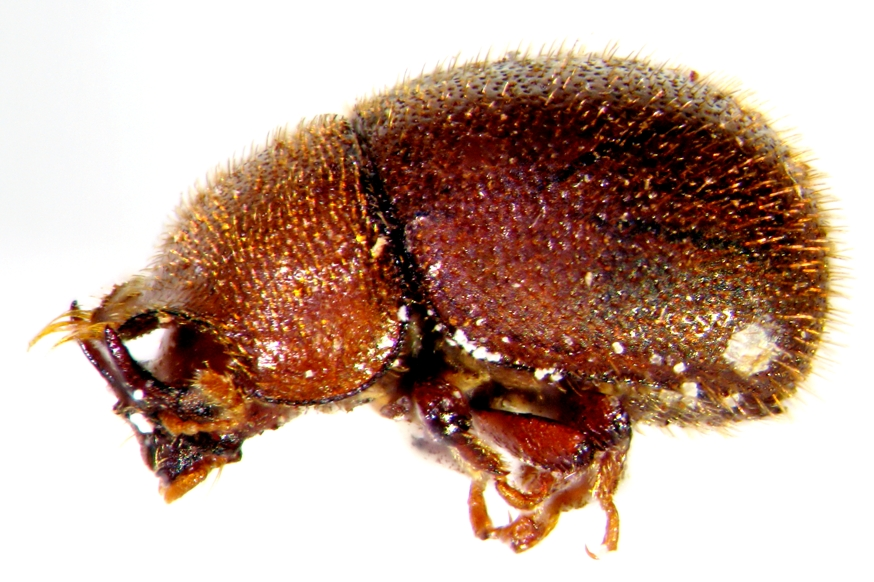
- Falsocis brasiliensis

Scientific classification
- Kingdom: Animalia
- Phylum: Arthropoda
- Clade: Pancrustacea
- Class: Insecta
- Order: Coleoptera
- Suborder: Polyphaga
- Infraorder: Cucujiformia
- Superfamily: Tenebrionoidea
- Family: Ciidae; Leach in Samouelle, 1819

Subfamilies
- Ciinae; Xylographellinae

Synonyms
- Cioidae; Cisidae; Cissidae

= Ciidae =

Family of beetles

The minute tree-fungus beetles, family Ciidae, are a sizeable group of beetles which inhabit Polyporales bracket fungi or coarse woody debris. Most numerous in warmer regions, they are nonetheless widespread and a considerable number of species occur as far polewards as Scandinavia for example.

== Description ==
As their name implies, minute tree-fungus beetles are tiny, about 0.8 to 6.9 mm (0.03 to 0.27 in) long. Their body is short and cylindrical, often convex, sometimes with a smooth coat of fine short hairs, sometimes being covered in long bristly hairs. They are mostly dark brown or blackish. The short antennae consist of 8–10 antennomeres. The pronotum is usually wider than long and often forming a quite prominent helmet-like structure. The elytra do not taper noticeably over most of their length. The legs are short, the tibiae of the forelegs often bear characteristic extensions at the ends.

== Ecology ==
These beetles usually inhabit Polyporaceae or more rarely Corticiaceae bracket fungi. The larvae as well as the adults burrow inside the fungi, often choosing old specimens or old tissue. The whole development, from egg to adult, often takes as little as two months; some are parthenogenetic. A few species are pests of commercial fungi, as in the case of Cis chinensis, which infests dried fruiting-bodies of Ganoderma lucidum.

At least one ciid, Falsocis brasiliensis, is a threatened species. It occurs only in small forest remnants of the Northeast and Southeast Regions of Brazil.

Minute tree-fungus beetles are food for many predatory insects, like rove beetles (Staphylinidae), checkered beetles (Cleridae) and parasitoid wasp larvae.

== List of genera ==
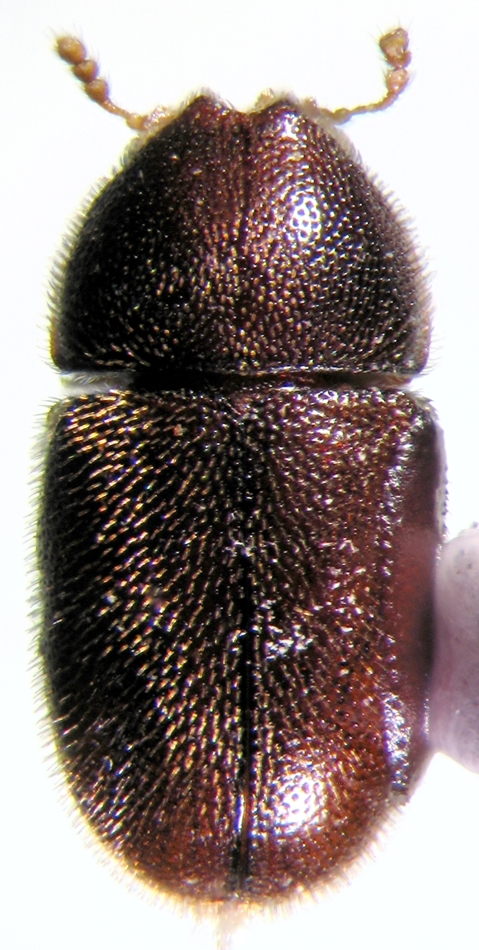
Cis chinensis (Ciinae: Ciini)

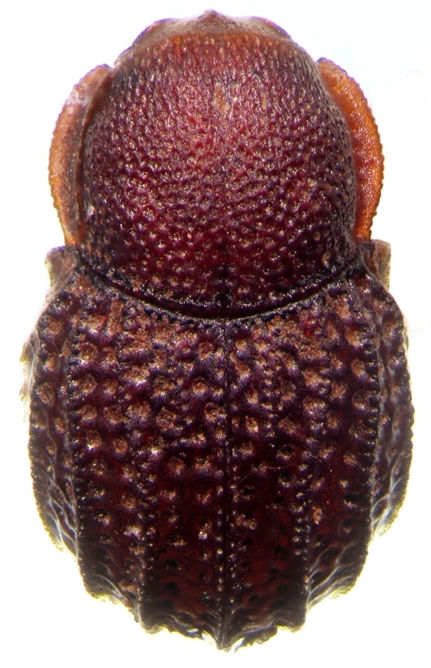
Syncosmetus japonicus (Ciinae: Xylographellini)

- Abebaeocis Souza-Gonçalves & Lopes-Andrade, 2025
- Acanthocis Miyatake, 1954
- Alcecis Souza-Gonçalves & Lopes-Andrade, 2025
- Aliocis Sandoval-Gómez & Lopes-Andrade, 2015
- Amphibolocis Lawrence, 2016
- Anartioscelos Souza-Gonçalves & Lopes-Andrade, 2025
- Apterocis Perkins, 1900
- Atlantocis Israelson, 1985
- Atomocis Souza-Gonçalves & Lopes-Andrade, 2025
- Australocis Lawrence, 2016
- Bucerocaputis Souza-Gonçalves & Lopes-Andrade, 2025
- Ceracis Mellié, 1849
- Cis Latreille, 1797
- Cisarthron Reitter, 1885
- Ctenocis Lawrence, 2016
- Dichodontocis Kawanabe, 1994
- Dimerapterocis Scott, 1926
- Diphyllocis Reitter, 1885
- Ditrichocis Lawrence, 2016
- Dolichocis Dury, 1919
- Echinocis Lawrence, 2016
- Ennearthron Mellié, 1847
- Euxestocis Miyatake, 1954
- Falsocis Pic, 1916
- Ferecis Lopes-Andrade, 2024
- Glyphidope Lawrence, 2016
- Grossicis Antunes-Carvalho, Sandoval-Gómez & Lopes-Andrade, 2012
- Gyraleosomus Souza-Gonçalves & Lopes-Andrade, 2025
- Hadreule Thomson, 1859
- Hyalocis Kawanabe, 1993
- Insolitocis Souza-Gonçalves & Lopes-Andrade, 2025
- Lipedanicis Souza-Gonçalves & Lopes-Andrade, 2025
- Lipopterocis Miyatake, 1954
- Macrocis Reitter, 1878
- Malacocis Gorham, 1886
- Malleecis Lawrence, 2016
- Neoapterocis Lopes-Andrade, 2007
- Neoennearthron Miyatake, 1954
- Nipponapterocis Miyatake, 1954
- Nipponocis Nobuchi & Wada, 1955
- Notapterocis Lawrence, 2016
- Octotemnus Mellié, 1847
- Orthocis Casey, 1898
- Paratrichapus Scott, 1926
- Paraxestocis Miyatake, 1954
- Phellinocis Lopes-Andrade & Lawrence, 2005
- Plesiocis Casey, 1898
- Polynesicis Zimmerman, 1938
- Porculus Lawrence, 1987
- Pseudeuxestocis Lawrence, 2016
- Ropalodontus Mellié, 1847
- Scolytocis Blair, 1928
- Strigocis Dury, 1917
- Sulcacis Dury, 1917
- Syncosmetus Sharp, 1891
- Tropicis Scott, 1926
- Xylographella Miyatake, 1985
- Xylographus Mellié, 1847
