= Streptococcus tigurinus =

Scientific classification
- Domain: Bacteria
- Kingdom: Bacillati
- Phylum: Bacillota
- Class: Bacilli
- Order: Lactobacillales
- Family: Streptococcaceae
- Genus: Streptococcus
- Species: S. tigurinus

Binomial name
- Streptococcus tigurinus Zbinden et al. 2012

Species of bacterium

Streptococcus tigurinus is a novel gram-positive bacteria from the genus Streptococcus, that was first discovered in 2012 by Swiss researchers.

== Identification ==
Streptococcus tigrinus is a member of the Gram-positive bacteria family Streptococcaceae and is identifiable by its 16S ribosomal RNA gene analysis. S. tigurinus was initially difficult to study due to its similarity to other bacteria causing it to go unnoticed, but it has recently been identified as being the most structurally related to Streptococcus mitis, Streptococcus pneumoniae, Streptococcus pseudopneumoniae, Streptococcus oralis, and Streptococcus intermedius.

== Pathogenesis ==
Streptococcus tigurinus is generally not a normal part of the human bacteria flora and it is currently unknown where its natural habitat is or its potential for colonization. The species is capable of causing serious infections if it manages to enter the body's bloodstream, usually through open wounds in the mouth, it was first discovered to cause invasive infections after it was isolated from a patient with infective endocarditis. It was later detected in the blood and cerebrospinal fluid of 14 other patients with varying types of serious invasive infections such as spondylodiscitis, bacteremia, meningitis, and empyema.

== Treatment ==
As S. tigurinus is relatively rare, scientists are still researching the most effective ways to combat the bacterium, with some strains showing resistance to drugs like tetracycline and an enhanced resistance to phagocytosis by macrophages.
