= Streptococcus lactarius =

Scientific classification
- Domain: Bacteria
- Kingdom: Bacillati
- Phylum: Bacillota
- Class: Bacilli
- Order: Lactobacillales
- Family: Streptococcaceae
- Genus: Streptococcus
- Species: S. lactarius

Binomial name
- Streptococcus lactarius Martín et al. 2011

Species of bacterium

Streptococcus lactarius is a species of catalase-negative, Gram-positive, coccus-shaped bacteria from the genus Streptococcus. First reported in 2010, it was found growing in the breast milk of three non-related healthy women. Based on 16S rRNA gene sequences, it is most similar to S. peroris.
