= Reports of Streptococcus mitis on the Moon =

Bacteria found on Surveyor 3 lunar probe

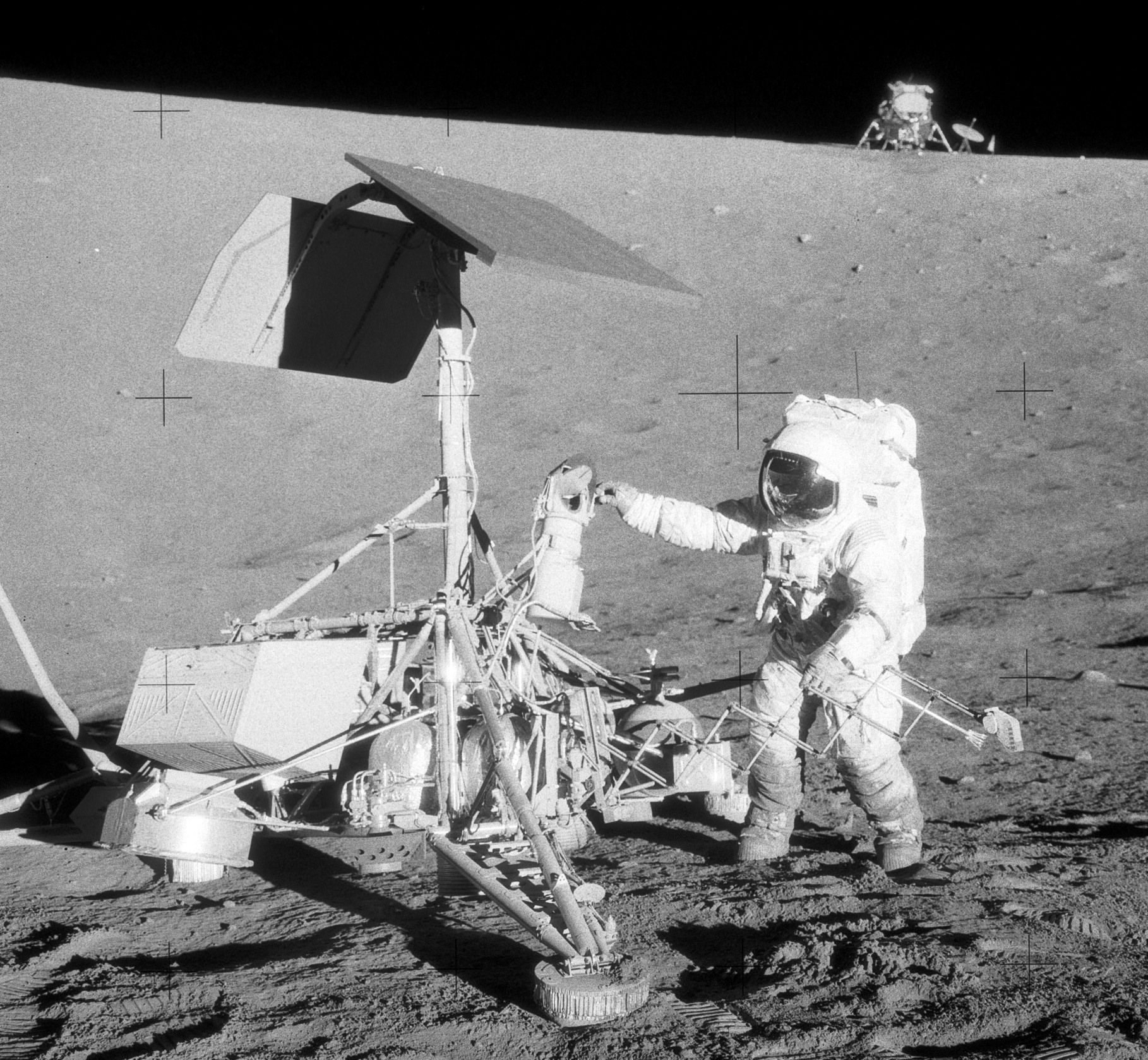
Pete Conrad with Surveyor 3

As part of the Apollo 12 mission in November 1969, the camera from the Surveyor 3 probe was brought back from the Moon to Earth. On analyzing the camera, it was found that the common bacterium Streptococcus mitis was alive on the camera. The camera was not sterilized on Earth before the space probe's launch in April 1967, two and a half years earlier. However, a later study showed that the scientists analyzing the camera on return to Earth used procedures that were inadequate to prevent recontamination after return to Earth, for instance with their arms exposed, not covering their entire bodies as modern scientists would do. There may also have been possibilities for contamination during the return mission as the camera was returned in a porous bag rather than the airtight containers used for lunar sample return. As a result, the source of the contamination remains controversial.

== History ==
Since the Apollo Program, there has been at least one independent investigation into the validity of the NASA claim. Leonard D. Jaffe, a Surveyor program scientist and custodian of the Surveyor 3 parts brought back from the Moon, stated in a letter to the Planetary Society that a member of his staff reported that a "breach of sterile procedure" took place at just the right time to produce a false positive result. One of the implements being used to scrape samples off the Surveyor parts was laid down on a non-sterile laboratory bench, and then was used to collect surface samples for culturing. Jaffe wrote, "It is, therefore, quite possible that the microorganisms were transferred to the camera after its return to Earth, and that they had never been to the Moon." In 2007, NASA funded an archival study that sought the film of the camera-body microbial sampling, to confirm the report of a breach in sterile technique.

The bacterial test is now non-repeatable because the parts were subsequently taken out of quarantine and fully re-exposed to terrestrial conditions (the Surveyor 3 camera is now on display in the Smithsonian Air and Space Museum in Washington, D.C.).

The Surveyor 3 camera was returned from the Moon in a nylon duffel bag, and was not in the type of sealed airtight metal container used to return lunar samples in the early Apollo missions. It is therefore possible that it was contaminated by the astronauts and the environment in the Apollo 12 capsule itself.

In March 2011, three researchers co-authored a paper titled "A Microbe on the Moon? Surveyor III and Lessons Learned for Future Sample Return Missions" that assessed the validity of claims that the S. mitis samples found on the camera had indeed survived for nearly three years on the Moon. The paper concluded that the presence of microbes could more likely be attributed to poor clean room conditions rather than the survival of bacteria for three years in the harsh environment of the Moon. The paper also discussed the implication this incident would have for contamination control in future space missions.

Countervailing evidence against the secondary contamination hypothesis is the fact that, according to Lieutenant Colonel Fred Mitchell, lead author of the original 1971 paper, there was a significant delay before the sampled culture began growing; this is consistent with the sampled bacteria consisting of dormant cells, but not if the sampled culture was the result of fresh contamination. In addition, according to Mitchell, the microbes clung exclusively to the foam during culturing, which would not have happened had there been contamination. Furthermore, if fresh contamination had occurred, millions of individual bacteria and "a representation of the entire microbial population would be expected"; instead, only a few individual bacteria were sampled, and only from a single species.

This subject was covered in the 2008 Discovery Channel documentary series, When We Left Earth and in the Science Channel series Nasa's Unexplained Files episode "Return of the Moon Bugs" .
