= Streptococcus castoreus =

Scientific classification
- Domain: Bacteria
- Kingdom: Bacillati
- Phylum: Bacillota
- Class: Bacilli
- Order: Lactobacillales
- Family: Streptococcaceae
- Genus: Streptococcus
- Species: S. castoreus

Binomial name
- Streptococcus castoreus Lawson et al., 2005

Species of bacterium

Streptococcus castoreus is a species of gram-positive, coccus-shaped bacteria. The species is notable for expressing the Lancefield group A antigen, a characteristic most commonly associated with Streptococcus pyogenes, but has primarily been isolated from beavers.

The species was first isolated in 2005 from a European beaver (Castor fiber). S. castoreus has since been isolated from North American beavers (Castor canadensis). Surveys of free ranging beavers found the bacteria present in the respiratory tract and intestinal tract of healthy beavers, suggesting that S. castoreus may be a part of the normal mucosa microbiota. However, the organism has also been isolated from purulent lesions, indicating it may act as an opportunistic pathogen under certain conditions. S. castoreus infections are often inflammatory and associated with other aerobic and aerobic bacteria.

S. castoreus is a catalase-negative, gram-positive cocci. Most strains are able to grow under aerobic conditions; however, some isolates are strictly capnophilic, requiring CO2 to grow. Colonies on blood agar show β-hemolysis, although the exact hemolysin produced by S. castoreus is unknown.

S. castoreus isolates from wild beavers are generally susceptible to β-lactam, cephalosporin, macrolide, and tetracycline antibiotics.
