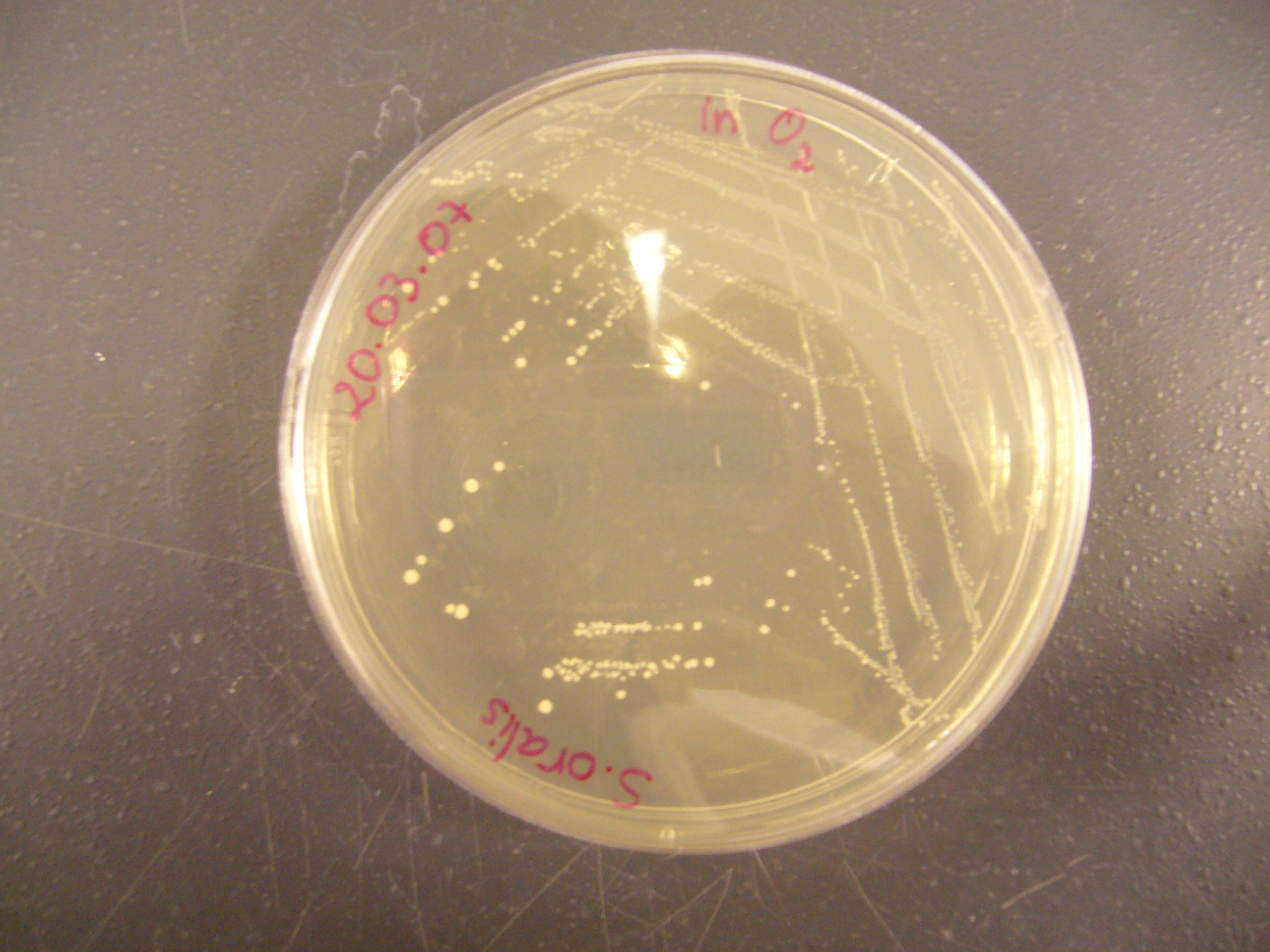

Scientific classification
- Domain: Bacteria
- Kingdom: Bacillati
- Phylum: Bacillota
- Class: Bacilli
- Order: Lactobacillales
- Family: Streptococcaceae
- Genus: Streptococcus
- Species: S. oralis

Binomial name
- Streptococcus oralis Bridge and Sneath 1982

= Streptococcus oralis =

Species of bacterium

Streptococcus oralis is a Gram positive viridans streptococcus of the Streptococcus mitis group. S. oralis is one of the pioneer species associated with eubiotic dental pellicle biofilms, and can be found in high numbers on most oral surfaces. It has been, however, found to be an opportunistic pathogen as well.

Individual cells of S. oralis are arranged into characteristic long chains when viewing subcultures under a microscope. It is a non-motile, non-sporulating facultative anaerobe. The optimal culturing temperature range for S. oralis is 35 - 37 °C, with growth observed between 10 - 45 °C. Blood agars selective for streptococci, such as brain heart infusion blood agar, are optimal for culturing S. oralis as these plates highlight its α-haemolysis, but nutrient agars such as trypticase soy agar or Wilkins-Chalgren anaerobe agar can support its growth also. S. oralis colonies are white, grey, or colourless; translucent; smooth; entire; raised cluster colonies 0.5-2.0 mm in diameter.

S. oralis is catalase negative and oxidase negative. Strains of S. oralis produce neuraminidase and cannot bind α-amylase. S. oralis is also acid-sensitive, producing alkaline metabolites to ameliorate its niche.

== Role in the oral microbiome ==
S. oralis is one of a few pioneer species important in early colonisation of the dental pellicle, where it establishes an eubiotic biofilm believed to be protective for teeth. It discourages competition by other mouth commensals and pathobionts such as S. mutans and Candida albicans implicated in dysbiotic biofilm formation by sequestering (i.e. accumulating and storing) nutrients and releasing metabolites such as H_{2}O_{2}. A recent study by Leo et al. has investigated the potential mechanism employed by S. oralis to achieve biofilm establishment. The study described a novel protease therein named MdpS released extracellularly by S. oralis, which directly breaks down MUC5B, an O-glycosylated protein which constitutes the majority of the dental pellicle. Through this interaction, S. oralis may be able to adhere to dental enamel, acquire nutrients from the broken-down MUC5B molecules, and hence establish the biofilm. The genome for this protease is highly conserved amongst the S. mitis group, but is notably distant from the genome of S. mutans, indicating that they occupy competing niches; MdpS is active at pH 6.5-7.5, whilst S. mutans modifies the pH of its environment to 4.5-5.5 by releasing lactic acid. MdpS also showed mild immunomodulatory activity, as the study found that it can cleave IgA to a certain extent. Since other IgA proteases of S. oralis have been described in prior literature, immunomodulation may be another adaptation advantageous for establishing the eubiotic biofilm. However, further research is required to establish these mechanisms further.

== Opportunistic pathogenicity ==
S. oralis has been implicated in opportunistic cases of bacteraemia, septicaemia and meningitis in immunocompromised patients, usually in relation to chronic dental disease and/or prior treatment which could provide a point of entry. The infection most associated with S. oralis is infective endocarditis.

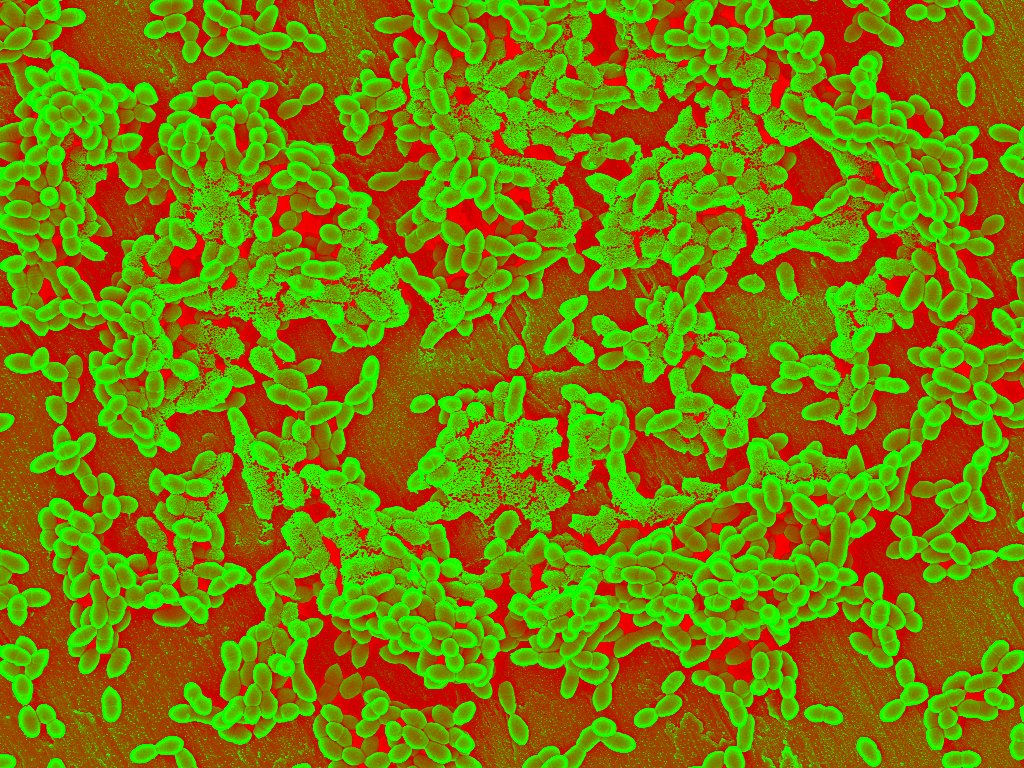
S. oralis exhibits a carpet‐like arrangement of two or three cell layers on titanium substrates, in vitro.

== Natural genetic transformation ==
Like other streptococci and oral commensals, S. oralis also shows high genetic diversity. As such, it is competent for natural genetic transformation. S. oralis cells are able to take up exogenous DNA and incorporate exogenous sequence information into their genomes by homologous recombination. These bacteria can employ a predatory fratricidal mechanism for active acquisition of homologous DNA.

== Note ==
- Marsh, Philip; Michael V. Martin (1999). Oral microbiology. Oxford [England]: Wright. ISBN 978-0-7236-1051-9.
