= Streptococcus ferus =

Scientific classification
- Domain: Bacteria
- Kingdom: Bacillati
- Phylum: Bacillota
- Class: Bacilli
- Order: Lactobacillales
- Family: Streptococcaceae
- Genus: Streptococcus
- Species: S. ferus

Binomial name
- Streptococcus ferus (ex Coykendall 1977) Coykendall 1983

Species of bacterium

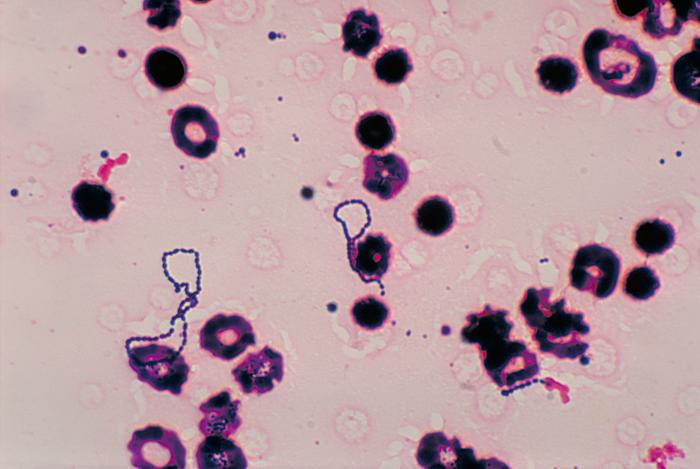
Streptococcus viridans blood agar culture

Streptococcus ferus is a Gram-positive streptococcus belonging to the Streptococcus genus. It was first isolated from wild animals, such as rodents, and is primarily found in the oral cavity and digestive tract of these hosts. S. ferus is considered part of the diverse and ecologically adaptable Streptococcus group.

Morphologically, S. ferus typically appears as spherical or ovoid cells arranged in chains. It is a facultative anaerobe, capable of surviving in both aerobic and anaerobic conditions. The bacterium requires suitable nutritional conditions for growth and exhibits specific hemolytic activity on blood agar, which is important for its identification and differentiation. Additionally, S. ferus possesses distinctive biochemical characteristics, such as fermenting certain carbohydrates and producing lactic acid, making it valuable in taxonomic studies and microbial diagnostics.

Regarding its pathogenicity, S. ferus is generally considered non-pathogenic or of low pathogenicity, mainly existing as part of the normal microbiota in wild animals. However, under specific conditions, particularly when the host's immune system is compromised or microbial balance is disrupted, it may act as an opportunistic pathogen, leading to localized or systemic infections. Further research is needed to understand its role in animal health and its potential zoonotic risks.

Molecular studies have revealed that the genomic features of S. ferus share similarities with other members of the Streptococcus genus while also exhibiting unique genetic markers. These findings provide insights into its classification, evolutionary relationships, and ecological adaptations. With advancements in molecular biology and microbial ecology, further exploration is required to understand its functional characteristics, metabolic capabilities, and interactions with host organisms.

== Overview ==
Streptococcus ferus is a facultatively anaerobic, gram-positive species of the genus Streptococcus. The species is a member of the Viridans streptococci group which are a large mixed-group of mostly alpha-hemolytic streptococci. The alpha-hemolytic bacteria are ones that exhibit a partial hemolysis with green coloration when grown on sheep blood agar (see image.)

== Ecology ==
Streptococcus ferus was originally isolated from the oral cavity wild rats who were living in sugar cane fields and eating a high sucrose diet The species name ferus, meaning wild, refers to their association with these animals. More recently the strain has also been isolated from the nasal and oral cavities of pigs. The species has not been identified in any other host organisms.

== Morphology ==
Streptococcus ferus are gram positive lanceolate coccobacillus Non-motile and approximately 0.5 micrometers in diameter. They are non-sporulating and catalase-negative The majority of specimens test positive for the production of acetoin (Vogues-Proskauer reaction). They occur singly, in pairs or in short chains.

== Pathogenicity ==
Streptococcus ferus is commensal in wild rats and pigs and demonstrates a relatively weak cariogenic potential compared to other streptococcus species such as S. mutans S. ferus has not had any reported pathogenic instances in humans.

== History ==
Streptococcus ferus was originally proposed as a species in 1977
