= Streptococcal infection in poultry =

Streptococcus species are the cause of opportunistic infections in poultry leading to acute and chronic conditions in affected birds. Disease varies according to the Streptococcal species but common presentations include septicaemia, peritonitis, salpingitis and endocarditis.

Common species affecting poultry include:

- S. gallinaceus in broiler chickens
- S. gallolyticus which is a pathogen of racing pigeons and turkey poults
- S. dysgalactiae in broiler chickens
- S. mutans in geese
- S. pluranimalium in broiler chickens
- S. equi subsp. zooepidemicus in chickens and turkeys
- S. suis in psittacine birds

== Diagnosis ==
Post-mortem findings include friable internal organs, abdominal effusion and evidence of sepsis in the joints, heart valves and brain.

Bacteria can usually be cultured from tissues collected at necropsy or identified by microscope examination.

== Treatment and control ==
The organism should be cultured and antibiotic sensitivity should be determined before treatment is started. Amoxycillin is usually effective in treating streptococcal infections.

Biosecurity protocols and good hygiene are important in preventing the disease.

Vaccination is available against S. gallolyticus and can also protect pigeons.
