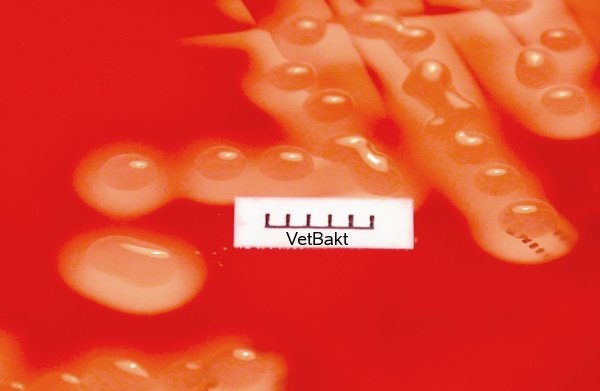
- Streptococcus zooepidemicus colonies on blood agar

Scientific classification
- Domain: Bacteria
- Kingdom: Bacillati
- Phylum: Bacillota
- Class: Bacilli
- Order: Lactobacillales
- Family: Streptococcaceae
- Genus: Streptococcus
- Species: S. zooepidemicus

Binomial name
- Streptococcus zooepidemicus

= Streptococcus zooepidemicus =

Species of bacterium

Streptococcus zooepidemicus is a Lancefield group C streptococcus that was first isolated in 1934 by P. R. Edwards, and named Animal pyogens A. It is a mucosal commensal and opportunistic pathogen that infects several animals and humans, but most commonly isolated from the uterus of mares. It is a subspecies of Streptococcus equi, a contagious upper respiratory tract infection of horses, and shares greater than 98% DNA homology, as well as many of the same virulence factors.

== Morphology ==
Streptococcus zooepidemicus are gram-positive, non-sporulating, non-motile, catalase and oxidase negative cocci. S. zooepidemicus is encapsulated, with a capsular polysaccharide containing hyaluronic acid, as well as being facultative anaerobes. The cells usually form in pairs, or as long chains. When plated on agar, colonies are usually 0.5-1.5 mm in diameter, circular, and opaque colored. They also have a smooth surface and a convex elevation. Its optimal temperature of growth is 37 degrees Celsius.

=== Biochemistry ===
Hemolysis on blood agar is beta-hemolytic. It ferments D-glucose, lactose, maltose, sucrose, salicin, D-sorbitol, and starch, but is negative for others like D-mannitol, glycerol, and inulin. S. zooepidemicus is also positive for Ala-Phe-Pro, Leucine, and Tyrosine arylamidase, all of which catalyze hydrolysis of amino acid residues from amino terminus of polypeptide chains. Antibiotic wise, S. zooepidemicus is highly susceptible to Penicillin, usually give for treatment, as well as Ampicillin and Erythromycin, but is extremely resistant to Novobiocin, Optochin, and Tribrissen.

== Genomic structure ==
The genome of S. zooepidemicus is a single circular chromosome of 2,024,171 base pairs. The G+C content of the genome is 42.59%, very close in value to S. equi, which is at the higher end of the genus for G+C content. It has 1961 predicted protein coding sequences, with an average length of 879 base pairs each, and coding for an approximate value of 292 amino acids. These coding regions make up approximately 85% of the genome. The genome has five ribosomal RNA operons, and 57 tRNAs. The overall similarity between S. zooepidemicus and S. equi, is over 92%.

S. zooepidemicus also produces a variety of extracellular proteins, about 100 genes identified so far, making up 5% of the total genome. These genes coding for extracellular proteins are slightly longer in length then others, approximately 478 amino acids each. 44 of these proteins are cell wall anchored surface proteins, which is a high number for Streptococcus species. This is one of the factors that lead to the high pathogenicity of S. zooepidemicus.

=== Strains ===
Known strains include:

- ATCC 43079
- CCUG 23256
- CIPP 103228
- DSM 20727
- LMG 16030
- NCDO 1358
- NCIMB 701358
- NCTC 4676

== Metabolism ==
The by-products of S. zooepidemicus fermentation is hyaluronic and lactic acid. The fermentation process is regulated by the production of hyaluronic acid. When high concentrations of the hyaluronic acid by-product are present, it will inhibit the production of more fermentation product. However, this fermentation process consumes high amounts of energy due to a number of factors. These factors include hyaluronic acid being severely limited, strong competition between hyaluronic synthesis and cell growth, and lactic acid being the main by-product of fermentation; which also will inhibit the overall fermentation process. Since hyaluronic acid is important for the virulence of S. zooepidemicus, as well as a valuable commercial production, hyaluronic acid production is constantly trying to be increased in industry and within the organism.

Commercial uses for hyaluronic acid include an ingredient in cosmetics, skin filler for anti-aging and lip injections, in viscosurgery, and a lubricating substance in arthritic joints.

== Virulence ==
Pathogenic gram positive bacteria species express cell-wall associated proteins that interact in various ways with the extracellular environment. These are made in order to benefit the organism for survival, as well as to help with establishing infection. Attachment to the epithelium cell surfaces is a critical step in the establishment of infection, and starting colonization. Overall, S. zooepidemicus is known to be more pathogenic than the S. equi species.

=== Virulence factors ===
Some cell-surface virulence factors, which all contribute to the pathogenicity of S. zooepidemicus, include:

- SzP proteins: similar to a surface M-protein, this protein is anti-phagocytic and anti-opsonization, with impairs with host protection. This is one of the most important virulence factors.
- FNZ protein: binds specifically to fibronectin, which is present on most host cell walls. This allows it to easily bind to and enter cells.
- FNZ2 protein: binds to collagen, also present on host cell walls, and fibronectin (similar to FNZ).
- SodA protein: destroys toxic free radicals, which are made by the host as a defensive mechanism.
- SeM: produces enterotoxins.

== Pathology ==
Streptococcus zooepidemicus is able to infect many different animals, such as horses, cows, rabbits, pigs, dogs, and cats. In animals, these symptoms can include fever, inflammation of thorax, lymph nodes, or abdomen, bronchopneumonia, sepsis, mastitis, and more. In Horses, S. zooepidemicus is normal flora bacterium, but is opportunistic and therefore will infect wounds, the respiratory system, and uterine, if given the chance. In horses, which are most commonly infected, this bacterium causes an upper respiratory tract infection (along with the other symptoms). This infection causes a highly contagious and deadly disease in horses. This will be caused by spreading of nasal discharge or lymph nodes in feed troughs, bedding, etc.

=== Human disease ===
S. zooepidemicus, which is considered a zoonotic pathogen, has rarely been isolated in humans, and infection is usually very rare. Infections are only known to be severe in immunocompromised people, namely the elderly who spent time around horses. There has also been cases of people acquiring the pathogen from homemade or unpasteurized milk or cheese. Most common symptoms of glomerulonephritis, rheumatic fever, meningitis, arthritis and more, leading to the death of several patients.

=== Outbreaks ===
Before 2017, there have been 32 reported cases of infections due to Streptococcus zooepidemicus.

In 2004, a 63-year-old man developed left thigh pain and swelling, which evolved into fevers, rigors, and skin rash. Two days, he experienced vertigo and vomiting, and was admitted into the hospital where he was treated with acute labyrinthitis, followed by meningococcal sepsis. Hypertension ensued, and edema of the left thigh muscle was discovered during surgery. These treatments were continued, but the patient went into progressive organ failure, followed by muscle necrosis, and ventricular tachycardia. The patient later went into circulatory and respiratory failure, before dying less than 48 hours after being admitted into the hospital.

Muscle biopsies determined S. zooepidemicus, as well as evidence of an unidentified superantigen exotoxin, to be the cause of infection, and toxic-shock like syndrome to be the cause of death. It was always noteworthy that the patient had frequent contact with horses, pigs, and cattle. This case study specifically is interesting as it strongly suggests an unidentified novel exotoxin, possibly produced by S. zooepidemicus.

In 2008, a 59-year-old woman was admitted to the emergency room due to body weakness and lightheadedness when standing, which starting three weeks prior. Over the past couple of days before being emitted she also reported shortness of breath, as well as resting tremors, rhinorrhea, and a chronic cough. She had a vast medicine history including hypertension, diabetes, obesity, chronic kidney failure, and more. She was treated for severe orthostatic hypo-tension, but in the following days complained of symptoms, and had test results that suggested meningitis. Various symptoms continued for almost a month until a blood culture tested positive for Streptococcus zooepidemicus. The patient was treated with intravenous antibiotics for six weeks, and her condition gradually improved. The patient stated there was a horse stable on her property, but she only visited it occasionally.
