= Streptococcus acidominimus =

Scientific classification
- Domain: Bacteria
- Kingdom: Bacillati
- Phylum: Bacillota
- Class: Bacilli
- Order: Lactobacillales
- Family: Streptococcaceae
- Genus: Streptococcus
- Species: S. acidominimus

Binomial name
- Streptococcus acidominimus Ayers and Mudge 1922 (Approved Lists 1980)

Species of bacterium

Streptococcus acidominimus is a species of nonmotile, gram-positive facultative anaerobic bacteria that is a member of the viridans group streptococci (VGS). It is a rare pathogen in humans.

== History ==
It was first isolated from bovines sources in 1922 by Ayers and Mudge.

== Infection ==
It is considered to be a common bacterial pathogen in veterinary medicine but is rarely pathogenic in humans. S. acidominimus is a major cause of infection for people who are critically ill. Due to the uncommonness and rarity of obtaining it in clinical bacteriology, S. acidominimus infections and limited cases, it is difficult to assess its epidemiologic and clinical significance. This also means that identifying S. acidominimus as a causative species is difficult. In recent years, S. acidominimus has been showing increased resistance to antimicrobial agents such as beta-lactams which is unusual since this species is usually sensitive to them.

In humans, this species have been reported in cases of pneumonia, pericarditis, meningitis, otitis median, sepsis, endocarditis and brain abscess.

== Treatment ==
Streptococcus acidominimus has been shown to be sensitive to antimicrobial agents.
