= Streptococcus infantarius =

Scientific classification
- Domain: Bacteria
- Kingdom: Bacillati
- Phylum: Bacillota
- Class: Bacilli
- Order: Lactobacillales
- Family: Streptococcaceae
- Genus: Streptococcus
- Species: S. infantarius

Binomial name
- Streptococcus infantarius Schlegel et al. 2000

Subspecies
- Streptococcus infantarius subsp. coli Schlegel et al. 2000; Streptococcus infantarius subsp. infantarius

Species of bacterium

Streptococcus infantarius is a species of gram-positive bacteria from the family Streptococcaceae.

== Natural genetic transformation ==
S. infantarius is competent for natural genetic transformation. Competence can be induced in cultures at high cell density, and is transient.
