= Streptococcus downei =

Scientific classification
- Domain: Bacteria
- Kingdom: Bacillati
- Phylum: Bacillota
- Class: Bacilli
- Order: Lactobacillales
- Family: Streptococcaceae
- Genus: Streptococcus
- Species: S. downei

Binomial name
- Streptococcus downei Whiley et al. 1988

Species of bacterium

Streptococcus downei is a species of catalase-negative, Gram-positive, coccus-shaped bacterium from the genus Streptococcus. Its type strain is MFe28 (NCTC 11391^{T}). It is thought to be cariogenic.
