= Lactovum miscens =

Scientific classification
- Domain: Bacteria
- Kingdom: Bacillati
- Phylum: Bacillota
- Class: Bacilli
- Order: Lactobacillales
- Family: Streptococcaceae
- Genus: Lactovum
- Species: L. miscens

Binomial name
- Lactovum miscens Matthies et al. 2005

Species of bacteria

Lactovum miscens is an anaerobic but aerotolerant species from the family of Streptococcaceae. The type strain was originally isolated from soil from the Steigerwald forest in the South German Scarplands.
