= Streptococcus cristatus =

Scientific classification
- Domain: Bacteria
- Kingdom: Bacillati
- Phylum: Bacillota
- Class: Bacilli
- Order: Lactobacillales
- Family: Streptococcaceae
- Genus: Streptococcus
- Species: S. cristatus

Binomial name
- Streptococcus cristatus corrig. Handley et al. 1991

Species of bacterium

Streptococcus cristatus is a species of viridans Streptococcus with tufted fibrils, first isolated from the human oral cavity and throat. Viridians Streptococci are Gram-positive and catalase-negative. The type strain is strain CR311 (= NCTC 12479).
