= Streptococcus halichoeri =

Scientific classification
- Domain: Bacteria
- Kingdom: Bacillati
- Phylum: Bacillota
- Class: Bacilli
- Order: Lactobacillales
- Family: Streptococcaceae
- Genus: Streptococcus
- Species: S. halichoeri

Binomial name
- Streptococcus halichoeri Lawson et al. 2004

Species of bacteria

Streptococcus halichoeri is a species of gram-positive, coccus-shaped bacterium from the order Lactobacillales. It was first described in 2004 after being isolated from gray seals (Halichoerus grypus) in the United Kingdom.

== Description ==
Streptococcus halichoeri is a gram-positive, catalase negative bacterium that forms chains of spherical cells. S. halichoeri possesses group B Lancefield antigens.

=== Culture ===
S. halichoeri is readily cultured on routine laboratory media. The species is a facultative anaerobe. On sheep blood agar, colonies are white and non-hemolytic after 24 hours of incubation.

== Human infections ==
Although initially identified in marine mammals, S. halichoeri has also been isolated from human clinical specimens.
