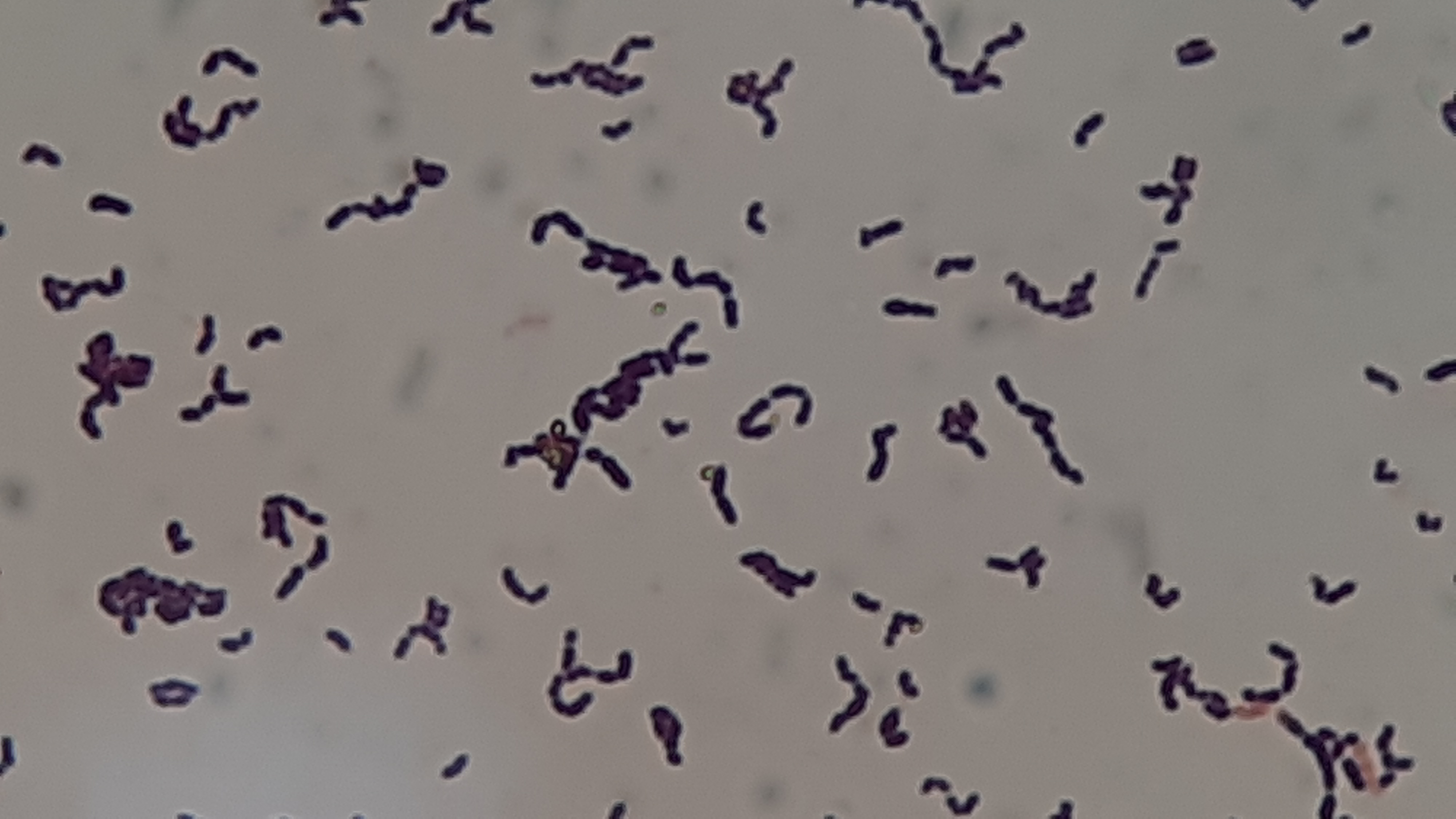
- Gram-stained S. sanguinis at 4000x magnification

Scientific classification
- Domain: Bacteria
- Kingdom: Bacillati
- Phylum: Bacillota
- Class: Bacilli
- Order: Lactobacillales
- Family: Streptococcaceae
- Genus: Streptococcus
- Species: S. sanguinis

Binomial name
- Streptococcus sanguinis White and Niven 1946

= Streptococcus sanguinis =

Species of bacterium

Streptococcus sanguinis, formerly known as Streptococcus sanguis, is a Gram-positive facultative anaerobic coccus species of bacteria and a member of the Viridans Streptococcus group. S. sanguinis is a normal inhabitant of the healthy human mouth where it is particularly found in dental plaque, where it modifies the environment to make it less hospitable for other strains of Streptococcus that cause cavities, such as Streptococcus mutans.

== Pathogenicity ==
S. sanguinis may gain entrance to the bloodstream when opportunity presents (dental cleanings and surgeries) and colonize the heart valves, particularly the mitral and aortic valves, where it is the most common cause of subacute bacterial endocarditis. For this reason, oral surgeons often prescribe a short course of antibiotics to be taken a few days before to a few days after oral surgery. Once an infection has occurred, treatment is much more complicated and generally involves the administration of several weeks of penicillin and aminoglycoside antibiotics.

== Genome ==
The complete genomic sequence of S. sanguinis was determined in 2007 by laboratories at Virginia Commonwealth University. The genome spans 2,388,435 bp and is larger than most of the other 21 streptococcal genomes that have been sequenced. The GC content of the S. sanguinis genome is 43.4% (higher than the GC contents of other streptococci). The genome encodes 2,274 predicted proteins, 61 tRNAs, and four rRNA operons. About 22% of the open reading frames are conserved hypothetical proteins (present in multiple species but having unknown functions), and approximately 645 of the predicted proteins were confirmed by mass spectrometry.

== Natural genetic transformation ==
S. sanguinis is naturally competent for genetic transformation. Natural genetic transformation is a process involving DNA transfer from one bacterial cell to another through the intervening medium, and the integration of the donor sequence into the recipient genome by homologous recombination.

== Essential gene identification ==
All essential genes are examined in S. sanguinis. Essential genes are those indispensable for organisms to grow and reproduce under certain environments. The use of metabolic networks to study all essential genes as a whole indicates that essential genes are related to the biological functions of genetic information processing, cell envelope and energy production. An essential genes database (ePath) for >4000 bacterial species is developed based on this finding.
