= Streptococcus ratti =

Scientific classification
- Domain: Bacteria
- Kingdom: Bacillati
- Phylum: Bacillota
- Class: Bacilli
- Order: Lactobacillales
- Family: Streptococcaceae
- Genus: Streptococcus
- Species: S. ratti

Binomial name
- Streptococcus ratti Coykendall 1977

Species of bacterium

Streptococcus ratti is a species of gram-positive, coccus-shaped bacteria from the genus Streptococcus. Streptococcus ratti is a commensal of the oral cavity. It is a type of bacteria that may be found in healthy individuals and may play a role in oral cavities. Streptococcus ratti is also a component of dental biofilms.
