= Streptococcus cricetus =

Scientific classification
- Domain: Bacteria
- Kingdom: Bacillati
- Phylum: Bacillota
- Class: Bacilli
- Order: Lactobacillales
- Family: Streptococcaceae
- Genus: Streptococcus
- Species: S. cricetus

Binomial name
- Streptococcus cricetus Coykendall 1977 (Approved Lists 1980)

Species of bacterium

Streptococcus cricetus is a species of Streptococcus.
