= Peptidoglycan-N-acetylglucosamine deacetylase =

Identifiers
- EC no.: 3.5.1.104

Databases
- IntEnz: IntEnz view
- BRENDA: BRENDA entry
- ExPASy: NiceZyme view
- KEGG: KEGG entry
- MetaCyc: metabolic pathway
- PRIAM: profile
- PDB structures: RCSB PDB PDBe PDBsum
Search
- PMC: articles
- PubMed: articles
- NCBI: proteins

Peptidoglycan-N-acetylglucosamine deacetylase (EC 3.5.1.104, HP310, PgdA, SpPgdA, BC1960, peptidoglycan deacetylase, N-acetylglucosamine deacetylase, peptidoglycan GlcNAc deacetylase, peptidoglycan N-acetylglucosamine deacetylase, PG N-deacetylase) is an enzyme with systematic name peptidoglycan-N-acetylglucosamine amidohydrolase. This enzyme catalyses the following chemical reaction

peptidoglycan-N-acetyl-D-glucosamine + H_{2}O $\rightleftharpoons$ peptidoglycan-D-glucosamine + acetate

This enzyme contributes to virulence of Helicobacter pylori, Listeria monocytogenes and Streptococcus suis.
