= Streptococcus orisratti =

Scientific classification
- Domain: Bacteria
- Kingdom: Bacillati
- Phylum: Bacillota
- Class: Bacilli
- Order: Lactobacillales
- Family: Streptococcaceae
- Genus: Streptococcus
- Species: S. orisratti

Binomial name
- Streptococcus orisratti Zhu et al. 2000

Species of bacterium

Streptococcus orisratti is a species of catalase-negative, Gram-positive, coccus-shaped bacteria from the genus Streptococcus. This species was first isolated from Sprague–Dawley rats, hence its name. Its type strain is A63^{T} (=ATCC 700640^{T}).
