= Cia-dependent small RNAs =

In molecular biology, cia-dependent small RNAs (csRNAs) are small RNAs produced by Streptococci. These RNAs are part of the regulon of the CiaRH two-component regulatory system. Two of these RNAs, csRNA4 and csRNA5, have been shown to affect stationary-phase autolysis.

== See also ==
- Bacterial small RNA
