= Lactovum =

Scientific classification
- Domain: Bacteria
- Kingdom: Bacillati
- Phylum: Bacillota
- Class: Bacilli
- Order: Lactobacillales
- Family: Streptococcaceae
- Genus: Lactovum; Matthies et al. 2005

Type species
- Lactovum miscens

Species
- L. miscens L. odontotermitis

Genus of bacteria

Lactovum is a genus of bacteria within the family Streptococcaceae, the genus is closely related to the genera Lactococcus and Pseudolactococcus.

== Biochemistry ==
Species in Lactovum are anaerobic, but aerotolerance has been reported for L. miscens.

The genome sequence of a related strain DF1, proposed with the name Anthococcus, with a genome size of 2.1 million bases, contains a CRISPR cluster which provides immunity against infectious phages. It also contains a fibronectin/fibrinogen-binding protein, a lysozyme and a regulator of exopolysaccharide synthesis for biofilm formation.

== Ecology ==
The type species of Lactovum, L. miscens was isolated from acidic forest soil, while L. odontotermitis was described from two strains, isolated from the guts of termites.
