= Streptococcus peroris =

Scientific classification
- Domain: Bacteria
- Kingdom: Bacillati
- Phylum: Bacillota
- Class: Bacilli
- Order: Lactobacillales
- Family: Streptococcaceae
- Genus: Streptococcus
- Species: S. peroris

Binomial name
- Streptococcus peroris Kawamura et al. 1998

Species of bacterium

Streptococcus peroris is a species of Streptococcus. In Foods, S. peroris was firstly reported in Tarhana (Fermented Turkish Food) by researchers.
