= Streptococcus pseudopneumoniae =

Scientific classification
- Domain: Bacteria
- Kingdom: Bacillati
- Phylum: Bacillota
- Class: Bacilli
- Order: Lactobacillales
- Family: Streptococcaceae
- Genus: Streptococcus
- Species: S. pseudopneumoniae

Binomial name
- Streptococcus pseudopneumoniae Arbique et al. 2004

Species of bacterium

Streptococcus pseudopneumoniae is a Gram-positive coccus that may cause pneumonia in humans. It was first described in 2004. The organism is often mistaken for S. pneumoniae and its clinical importance is as yet uncertain. It seems likely that most cases of S. pseudopneumoniae pneumonia are misdiagnosed as S. pneumoniae.

The bacterium has a number of features that allows it to be distinguished from S. pneumoniae:

- There is no pneumococcal capsule (and is therefore not typable).
- It is not soluble in bile.
- It is sensitive to optochin when incubated in ambient air, but appears resistant or to have indeterminate susceptibility when incubated in 5% carbon dioxide.
- Commercial DNA probe hybridization tests (e.g., AccuProbe Streptococcus pneumoniae culture identification test; Gen-Probe, San Diego, CA) are falsely positive.

Penicillin is the treatment of choice. Most reported isolates are resistant to erythromycin and to tetracycline.
