= Streptococcus suis =

Scientific classification
- Domain: Bacteria
- Kingdom: Bacillati
- Phylum: Bacillota
- Class: Bacilli
- Order: Lactobacillales
- Family: Streptococcaceae
- Genus: Streptococcus
- Species: S. suis

Binomial name
- Streptococcus suis (ex Elliot 1966); Kilpper-Bälz & Schleifer 1987

Species of bacterium

Streptococcus suis is a peanut-shaped, Gram-positive bacterium, and an important pathogen of pigs. Endemic in nearly all countries with an extensive pig industry, S. suis is also a zoonotic disease, capable of transmission to humans from pigs. In 2023, it was first reported from fish, isolated during a lethal outbreak in farmed snakeskin gourami (Trichopodus pectoralis).

Humans can be infected with S. suis when they handle infected pig carcasses or meat, especially with exposed cuts and abrasions on their hands. Human infection can be severe, with meningitis, septicaemia, endocarditis, and deafness as possible outcomes of infection. Fatal cases of S. suis are uncommon, but not unknown.

Penicillin is the most common antibiotic used in treatment of S. suis infection; in cases with cardiac involvement (endocarditis), gentamicin should also be given for synergistic effect.

== Epidemiology and transmission ==
The natural habitat of S. suis in pigs is the upper respiratory tract, particularly the tonsils and nasal cavity, and the alimentary and genital tracts. An individual pig can carry more than serotype in their nasal cavity. Incidence of disease varies but is usually less than 5%. Disease is often introduced into a noninfected herd via healthy carrier animals and during outbreaks when sick animals shed more bacteria horizontal transmission by direct contact or aerosol is important. Flies can also spread bacteria between farms and wild boar in many countries are known to carry S. suis and may be an important reservoir. S. suis was historically regarded as a pathogen of pigs and humans. Its known host range expanded with the first confirmed report in fish in 2023, when the bacterium was isolated during a high-mortality outbreak in farmed snakeskin gourami (T. pectoralis) and experimental challenge reproduced disease in healthy fish.

== Clinical signs and diagnosis ==
The first sign in pigs is usually pyrexia and there may be sudden deaths in the herd. Respiratory disease, with pneumonia, nasal discharge and respiratory difficulties, may also be present. Neurological signs result from meningitis, and signs may be severe, ranging from tremors to seizures and death. Joints may become infected and pigs may be lame or have swollen limbs. Skin disease is another presentation, and reproductive disease can also occur. Meningitis is the most common presentation in humans.

The bacterium can be isolated from various body fluids, and serological testing with an ELISA can also be performed.

== Treatment and control ==
Most S. suis strains respond to treatment with ampicillin and amoxicillin. Anti-inflammatories should also be used.

Control relies on good husbandry and biosecurity protocols and appropriate disinfection. Vaccines exist but are not reliable.

== Zoonotic outbreaks ==
In July 2005, an outbreak of the disease in humans was reported in Sichuan, China, with higher than usual human morbidity and mortality; over 100 cases and more than 20 deaths were initially reported. Prior to this outbreak, less than 200 total human cases had been reported, and mortality was assumed to be less than 10%. Details of this outbreak and a similar earlier outbreak, also in Sichuan province, were published in 2006. A smaller outbreak occurred at the same time in Hong Kong, affecting 11 people.

A total of 204 human cases were documented during the Sichuan outbreak, with 38 fatalities. The human outbreak coincided with one in the local pig populations. There was no evidence of human-to-human transmission; all of the patients had been in direct contact with pigs. Many of the patients, and almost all of the fatal cases, had typical symptoms of streptococcal toxic shock syndrome (STSS). To date, STSS had only been documented in patients infected with S. pyogenes, another member of the Streptococcus genus but very different from S. suis. However, the bacteria isolates from the human and pig samples were clearly S. suis, and those isolates were able cause typical S. suis disease in piglets.

The genome of S. suis isolates from the outbreak were examined to see whether its DNA sequence could explain why these particular bacteria were able to cause STSS. However, none of the genes that are present in S. pyogenes and thought to cause STSS were detected in the S. suis isolates. Comparison with other S. suis isolates from around the world, including one from an earlier smaller S. suis outbreak in Sichuan province that killed 14 out of 25 reported human cases, revealed that the two Chinese isolates were more similar to each other than to any other strains.

Additional experiments are necessary to determine whether the size and high mortality of the recent outbreak is because the Chinese S. suis version is more virulent than other strains or due to the circumstances under which the Chinese patients got infected and treated. Studies are under way to characterize the bacterial isolates from the outbreak in detail. Physicians around the world should be aware of the possibility of S. suis-associated STSS when they see patients with unexplained sepsis who had been in contact with pigs.

Streptococcus suis has also been identified as the most common cause of meningitis in Vietnam.

The 2012 deaths of 64 of 66 children in Cambodia affected with a complex syndrome including meningitis and pneumonia has been linked to a multiple infection of the children with Dengue fever, Enterovirus 71 and S. suis The use of steroids in the treatment of the severe illness has also been associated with the deaths, and the WHO has advised against the use of steroids in the treatment of this syndrome.

== Detection ==
Detection of the zoonotic bacterial pathogen Streptococcus suis was achieved using magnetic glycoparticles. The bacteria contain an adhesion protein for the carbohydrate sequence Gal-1,4Gal. After incubation with various amounts of the pathogen, magnetic concentration and ATP detection, bacterial levels down to 10^5 cfu could be detected.
