= Surveyor 3 =

NASA lunar lander

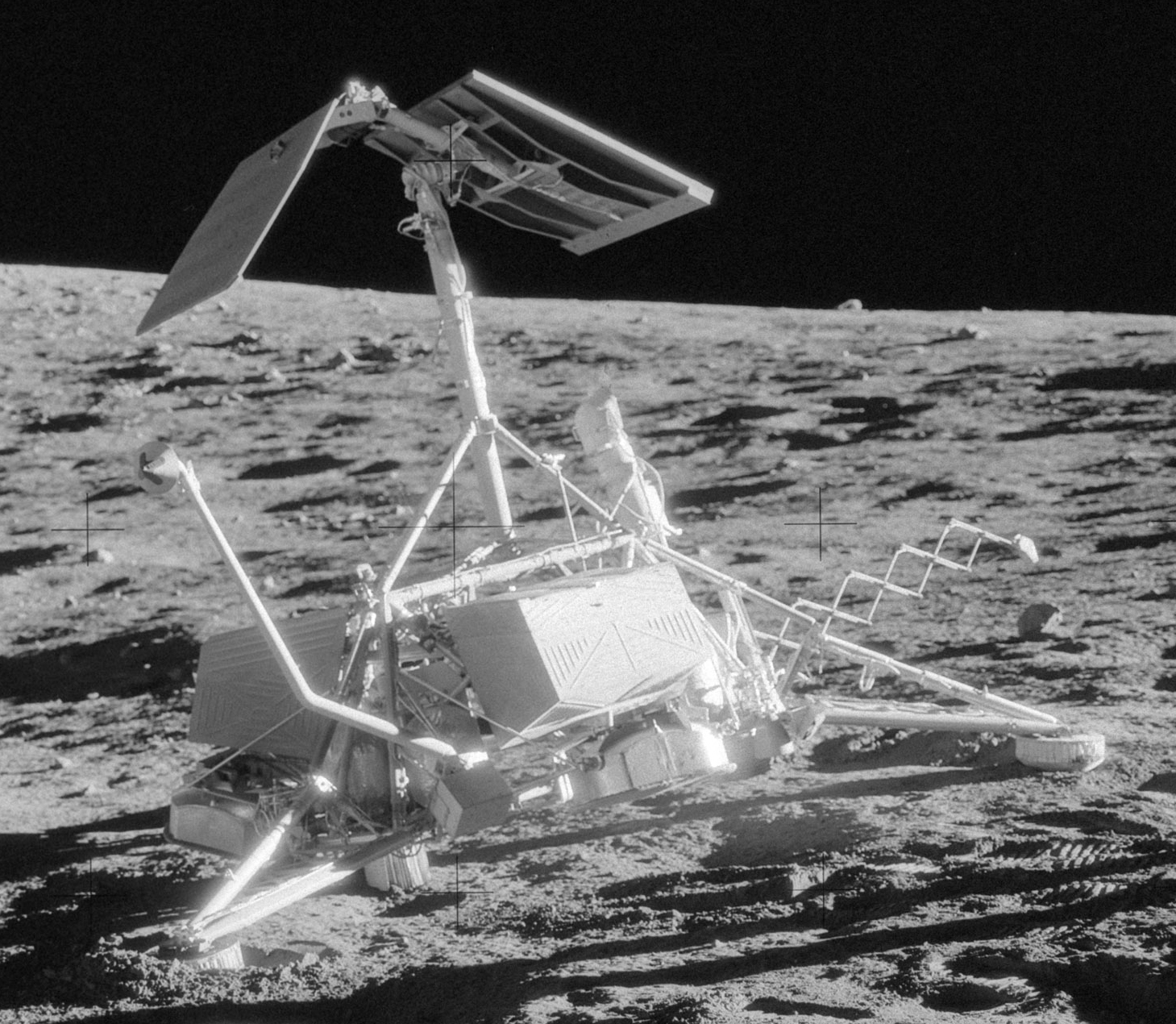
- Surveyor 3 on the Moon, photographed by Apollo 12 astronaut Alan Bean over two years after it landed
- Mission type: Lunar lander
- Operator: NASA
- COSPAR ID: 1967-035A
- SATCAT no.: 02756
- Mission duration: 16 days (launch to last contact)

Spacecraft properties
- Manufacturer: Hughes Aircraft
- Launch mass: 2,262 lb (1,026 kg)
- Landing mass: 653 lb (296 kg)

Start of mission
- Launch date: April 17, 1967, 07:05:01 UTC
- Rocket: Atlas LV-3C Centaur-D AC-12
- Launch site: Cape Canaveral, LC‑36B

End of mission
- Last contact: May 3, 1967

Lunar lander
- Landing date: April 20, 1967, 00:04:53 UTC
- Landing site: 3.01612°S 23.41791°W

Surveyor 3 is the third lander of the American uncrewed Surveyor program sent to explore the surface of the Moon in 1967 and the second to successfully land. It was the first mission to carry a surface-soil sampling-scoop.

Surveyor 3 was visited by Apollo 12 astronauts Pete Conrad and Alan Bean in November 1969, and remains the only probe visited by humans on another world. The Apollo 12 astronauts excised several components of Surveyor 3, including the television camera, and returned them to Earth for study.

== History ==
Launched on April 17, 1967, Surveyor 3 landed on April 20, 1967, at the Mare Cognitum portion of the Oceanus Procellarum, in a small crater that was subsequently named Surveyor. It transmitted 6,315 TV images to the Earth, including the first images to show what planet Earth looked like from the Moon's surface.

As Surveyor 3 was landing in the crater highly reflective rocks confused the spacecraft's lunar descent radar. The engines failed to cut off at 14 feet (4.3 meters) in altitude as called for in the mission plans, and this delay caused the lander to bounce on the lunar surface twice. Its first bounce reached the altitude of about 35 feet (11 meters). The second bounce reached a height of about 11 feet (3.4 meters). On the third impact with the surface – from the initial altitude of 10 feet (3 meters), and velocity of zero, which was below the planned altitude of 14 feet (4.3 meters), and very slowly descending – Surveyor 3 settled down to a soft landing as intended.

This Surveyor mission was the first that carried a surface-soil sampling scoop, which can be seen on its extendable arm in the pictures. This mechanism was mounted on an electric-motor-driven arm and was used to dig four trenches in the lunar soil. These trenches were up to 7 inches (18 cm) deep. Samples of soil from the trenches were placed in front of the Surveyor's television cameras to be photographed and the pictures radioed back to the Earth. When the first lunar nightfall came on May 3, 1967, Surveyor 3 was shut down because its solar panels were no longer producing electricity. At the next lunar dawn (after 14 terrestrial days, or about 336 hours), Surveyor 3 could not be reactivated, because of the extremely cold temperatures that it had experienced. This is in contrast with the Surveyor 1, which was able to be reactivated twice after lunar nights, but then never again.

Surveyor 3 became famous after the crew of Apollo 12 used it as a landing target site. Landing within walking distance on November 19, 1969, the astronauts took several pictures of the probe and removed a scoop from the probe's soil mechanics-surface sampler, a section of unpainted aluminum tube from a strut supporting the Surveyor's radar altimeter and Doppler velocity sensor, another section of aluminum tube that was coated with inorganic white paint and a segment of television cable wrapped in aluminized plastic film and the Surveyor 3's television camera which were returned to Earth. Surveyor 3 is the only probe visited by humans on another world.

== Science instruments ==
=== Television ===
The television camera on Surveyor 3 consisted of a vidicon tube, two 25 and 100 millimeter focal length lenses, shutters, clear, red, green and blue optical filters, and an iris mounted along an axis inclined about 16 degrees to the central axis of the spacecraft. The TV camera was mounted under a mirror that could be moved in azimuth (horizontally) and elevation (vertically). The operation of the camera was completely dependent upon the receipt of proper commands from the Earth. Frame-by-frame coverage of the lunar surface was obtained over the complete 360 degrees in azimuth, and from +40 degrees above the plane normal to the camera's Z-axis to −65 degrees below this plane. Both 600-line and 200-line modes of TV camera operation were used. The 200-line mode transmitted over an omnidirectional antenna and scanned one frame every 61.8 seconds. A complete video transmission of each 200-line picture required 20 seconds and used a bandwidth of 1.2 kHz. The 600-line pictures were transmitted over a directional antenna. These pictures were scanned as often as once every 3.6 seconds. Each 600-line picture required a nominal one second to be read from the image vidicon, and its transmission required a 220 kHz bandwidth, using digital picture transmission. The TV photos were displayed back on the Earth on a slow-scan TV monitor that was coated with a long-persistence phosphor. Its persistence had been selected to match the nominal maximum frame rate. One frame of TV identification was received for each incoming TV photo, and the picture was displayed in real-time at a rate compatible with that of the incoming image. These data were recorded on a video magnetic-tape recorder. The camera returned 6315 pictures between April 20 and May 3, 1967, including views of the spacecraft itself, panoramic lunar surveys, views of the mechanical surface digger at work, and of an April 24 eclipse of the Sun by the Earth.

The Apollo 12 Lunar Module landed near Surveyor 3 on November 19, 1969. Astronauts Conrad and Bean examined the spacecraft, and they brought back about 22 pounds (10 kg) of parts of the Surveyor to the Earth, including its TV camera, which is now on permanent display in the National Air and Space Museum in Washington, D.C.

Analysis of the camera found that it withstood 947 days in the vacuum of space, including 32 two-week lunar nights with temperatures dropping below −200 °F (−130 °C), in good condition. Most major components were functional and undamaged. Some changes were caused by temperature extremes, micrometeorite strikes, and manufacturing errors. The recovered sampler scoop was also in good condition with little change other than some sun-induced fading of the paint.

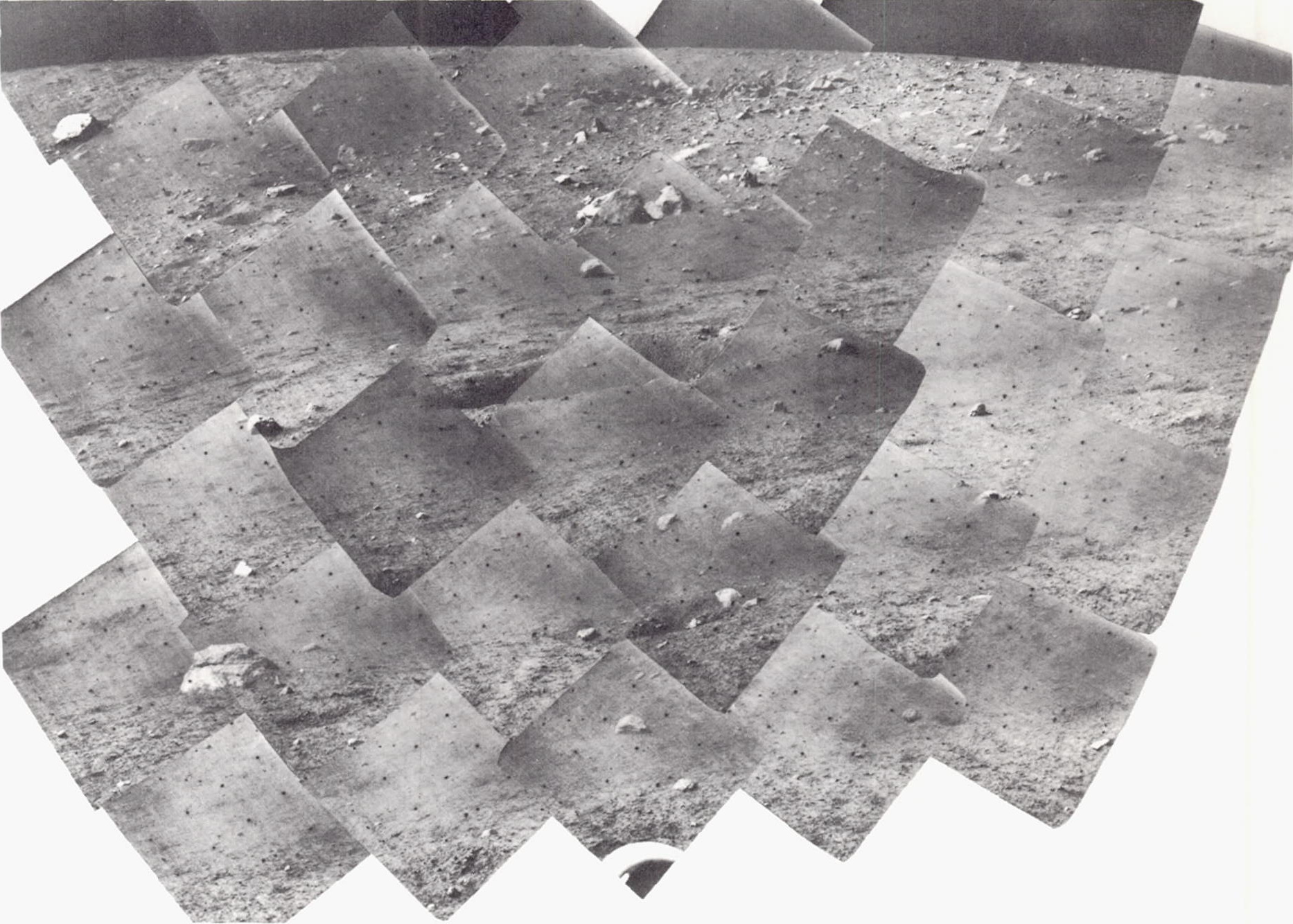
Panorama of the mare surface

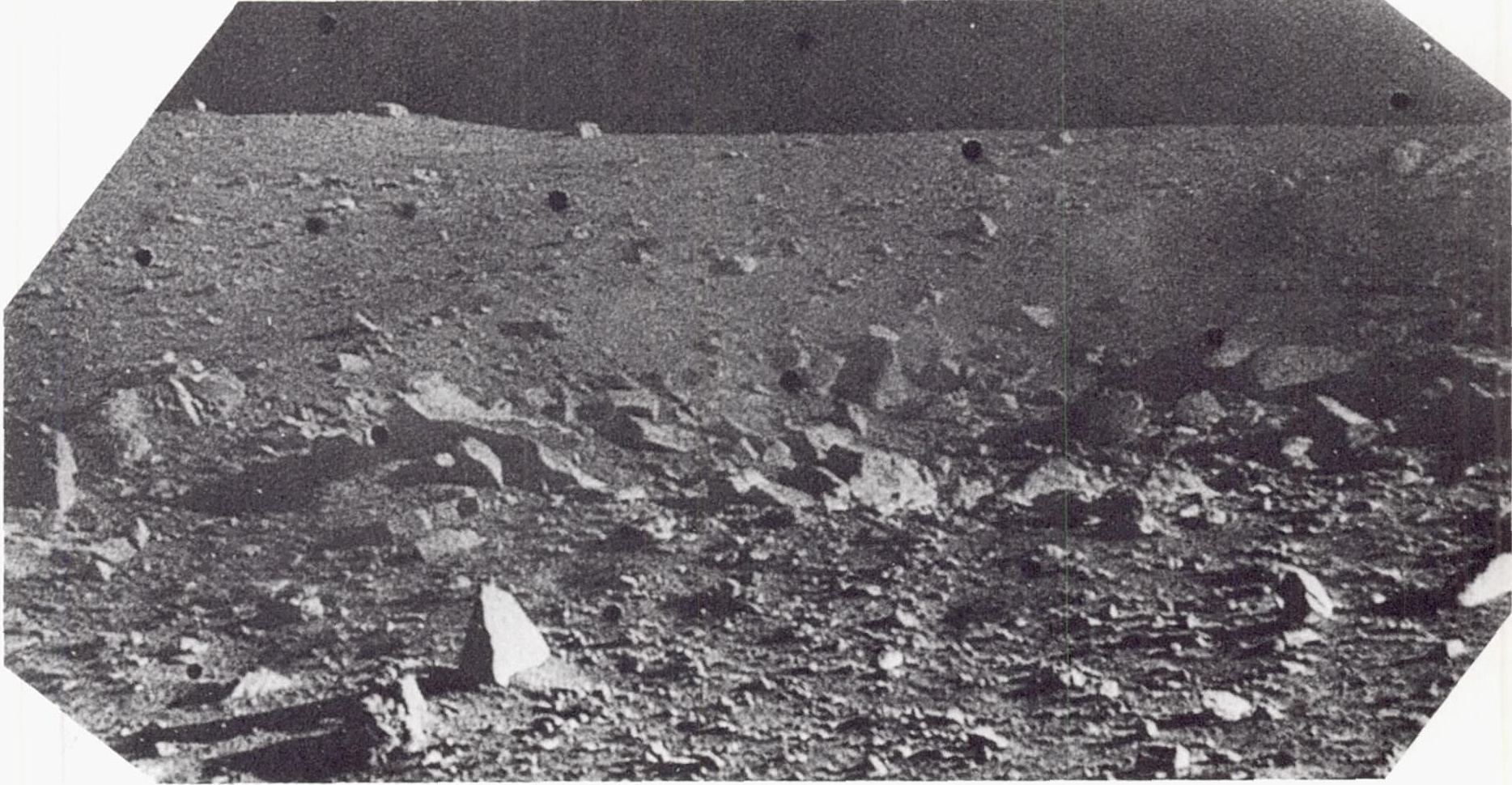
Angular blocks, up to 7 feet (2 meters) in diameter, which form part of a strewn field of blocks that surround a sharp-rim crater 10 feet (3 meters) in diameter

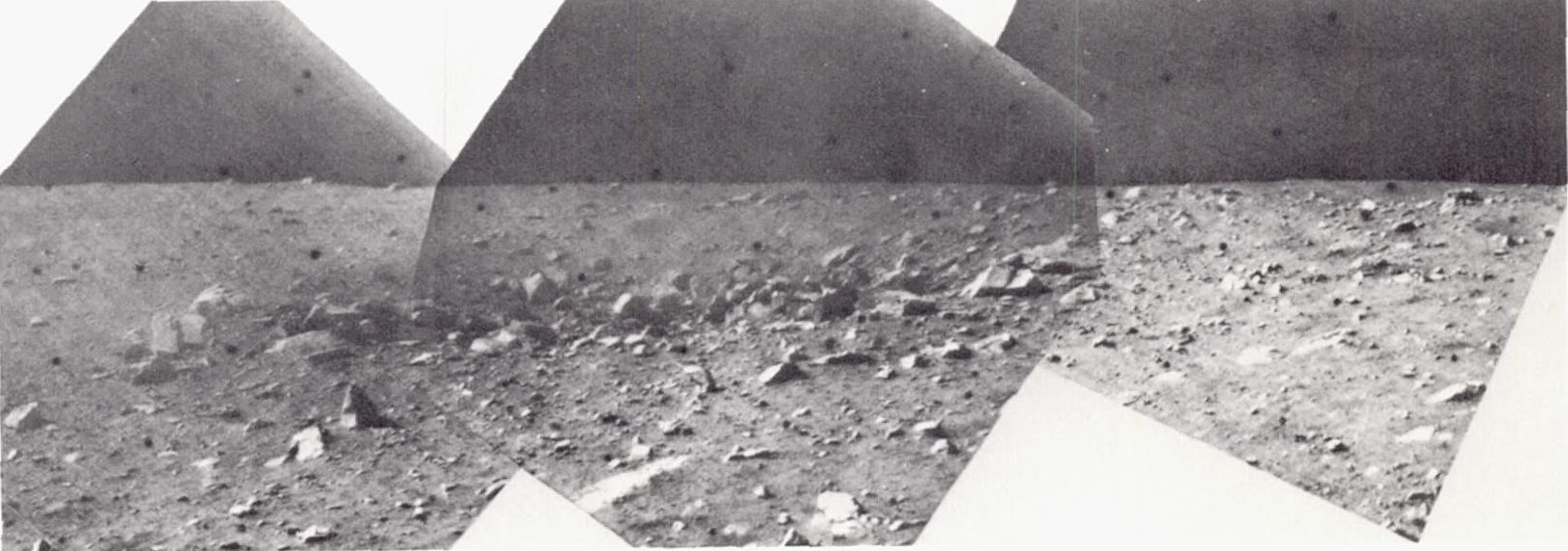
Similar view but with different lighting

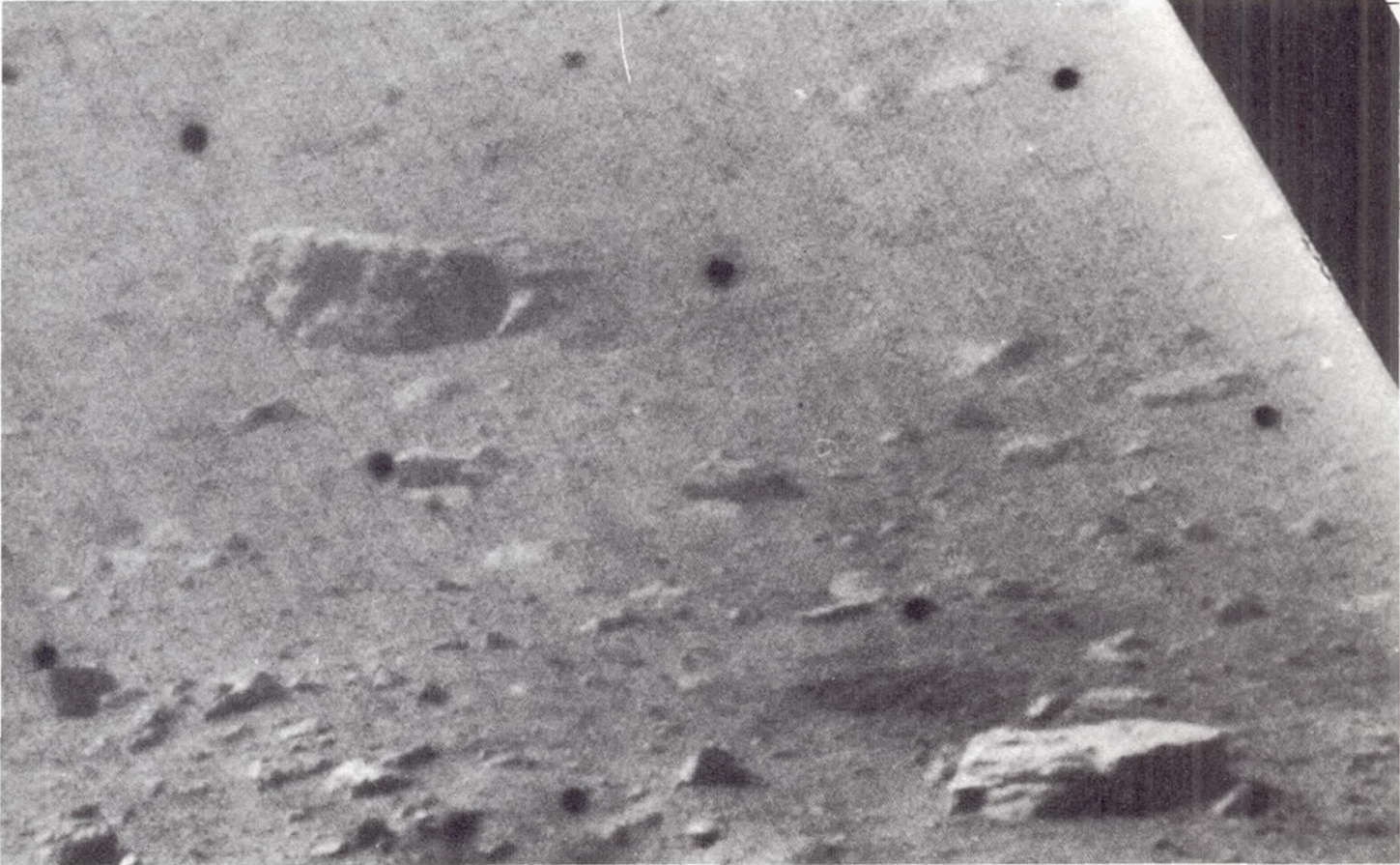
Blocky fragments on north wall of crater in which the spacecraft is located

=== Soil mechanics surface sampler ===
The soil mechanics surface sampler was designed to dig, scrape, and trench the lunar surface and to transport lunar surface material while being photographed so that the properties of the lunar surface could be determined. The sampler was mounted below the television camera and consisted primarily of a scoop approximately 4.7 inches (120 mm) long and 2.0 inches (50 mm) wide. The scoop consisted of a container, a sharpened blade, and an electric motor to open and close the container. A small footpad was attached to the scoop door to present a flat surface to the lunar surface. The scoop was capable of holding a maximum quantity of approximately 1.3 inches (32 mm) diameter of solid lunar material and a maximum of 6.1 cubic inches (100 cm^{3}) of granular material. The scoop was mounted on a pantograph arm that could be extended about 5 feet (1.5 m) or retracted close to the spacecraft motor drive. The arm could also be moved from an azimuth of +40 to -72 degrees or be elevated 5.1 inches (130 mm) by motor drives. It could also be dropped onto the lunar surface under force provided by gravity and a spring. The surface sampler performed seven bearing tests, four trench tests, and thirteen impact tests. The total operating time was 18 hours, 22 minutes on ten separate occasions. Measurements of motor currents and forces applied to the surface were not obtained due to the state of the spacecraft telemetry following landing on the lunar surface. However, estimations were possible. The small spring constant of the torque spring precluded the determination of density from the impact tests. Penetrations of 1.5 to 2.0 in (38 to 50 mm) were obtained from the bearing tests, and a 6.9 in (175 mm) depth was reached during trenching operations. The design of the mechanism and its electronic auxiliary was more than adequate for the lunar surface operations. The scoop was also returned to Earth by the Apollo 12 astronauts and is currently on display at JPL.

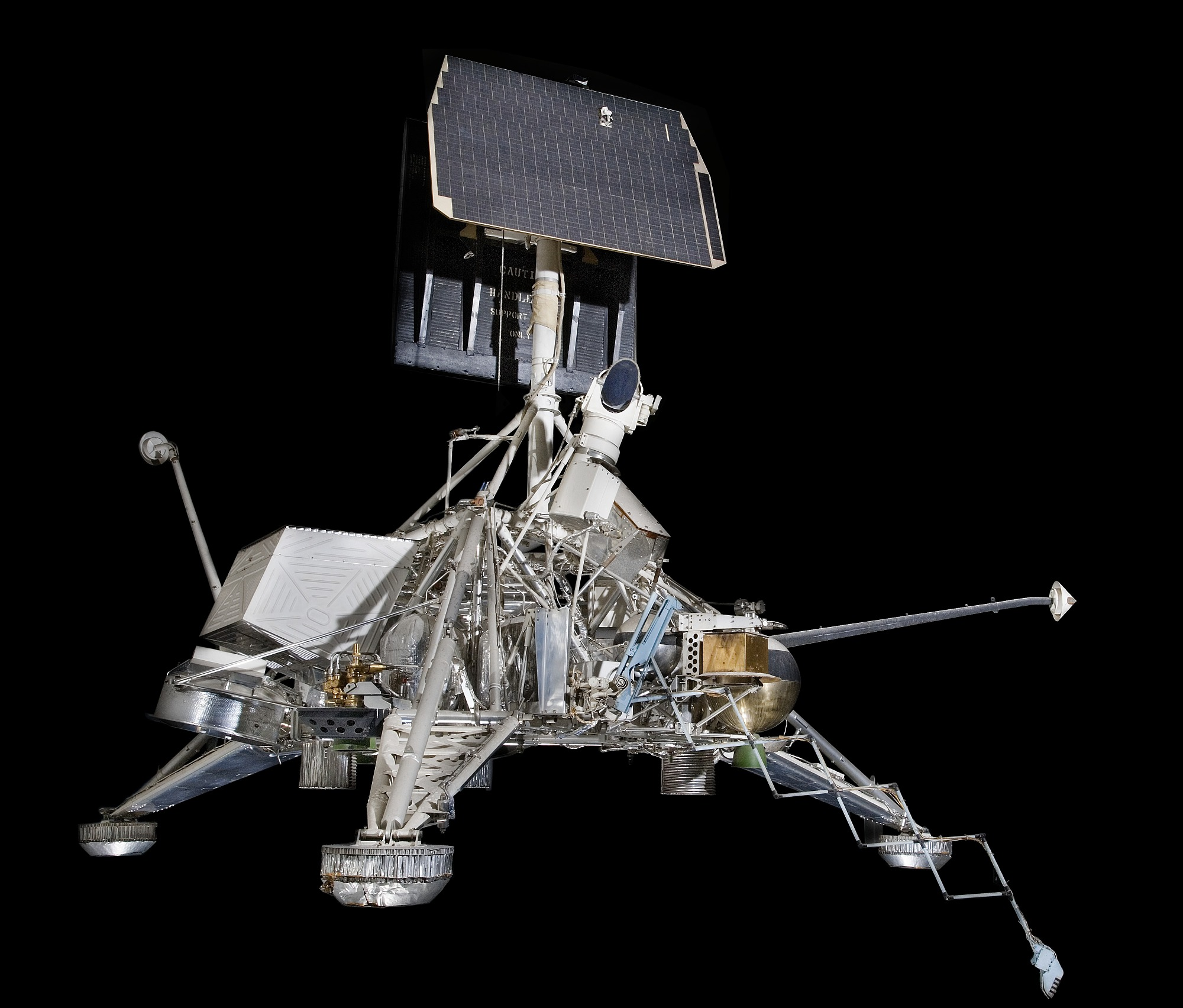
An engineering model of Surveyor 3, S-10, used for thermal control tests, reconfigured to represent a flight model of Surveyor 3 or later, at the National Air and Space Museum (NASM)

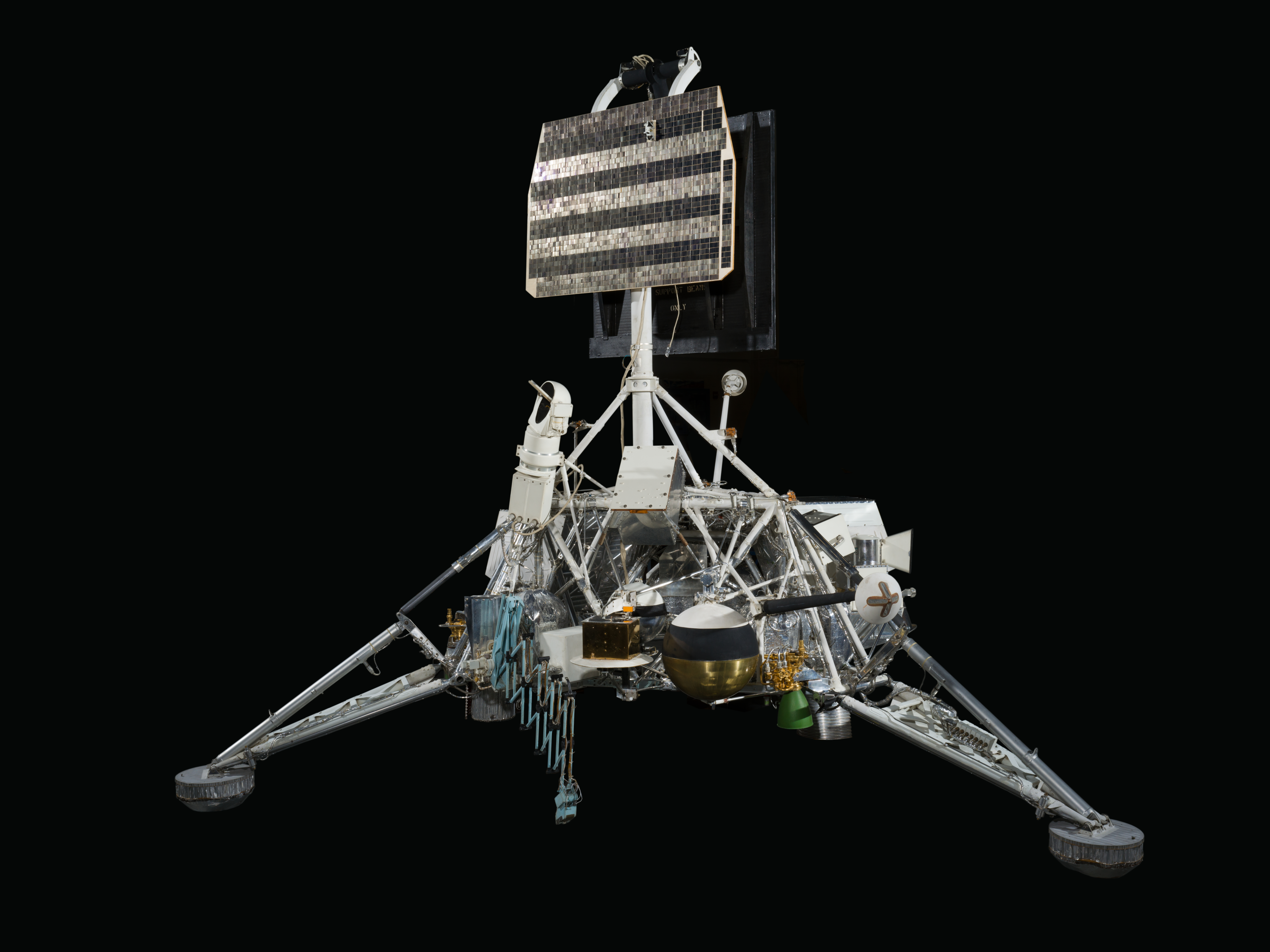
Three-quarter view from below of Surveyor engineering model (NASM)

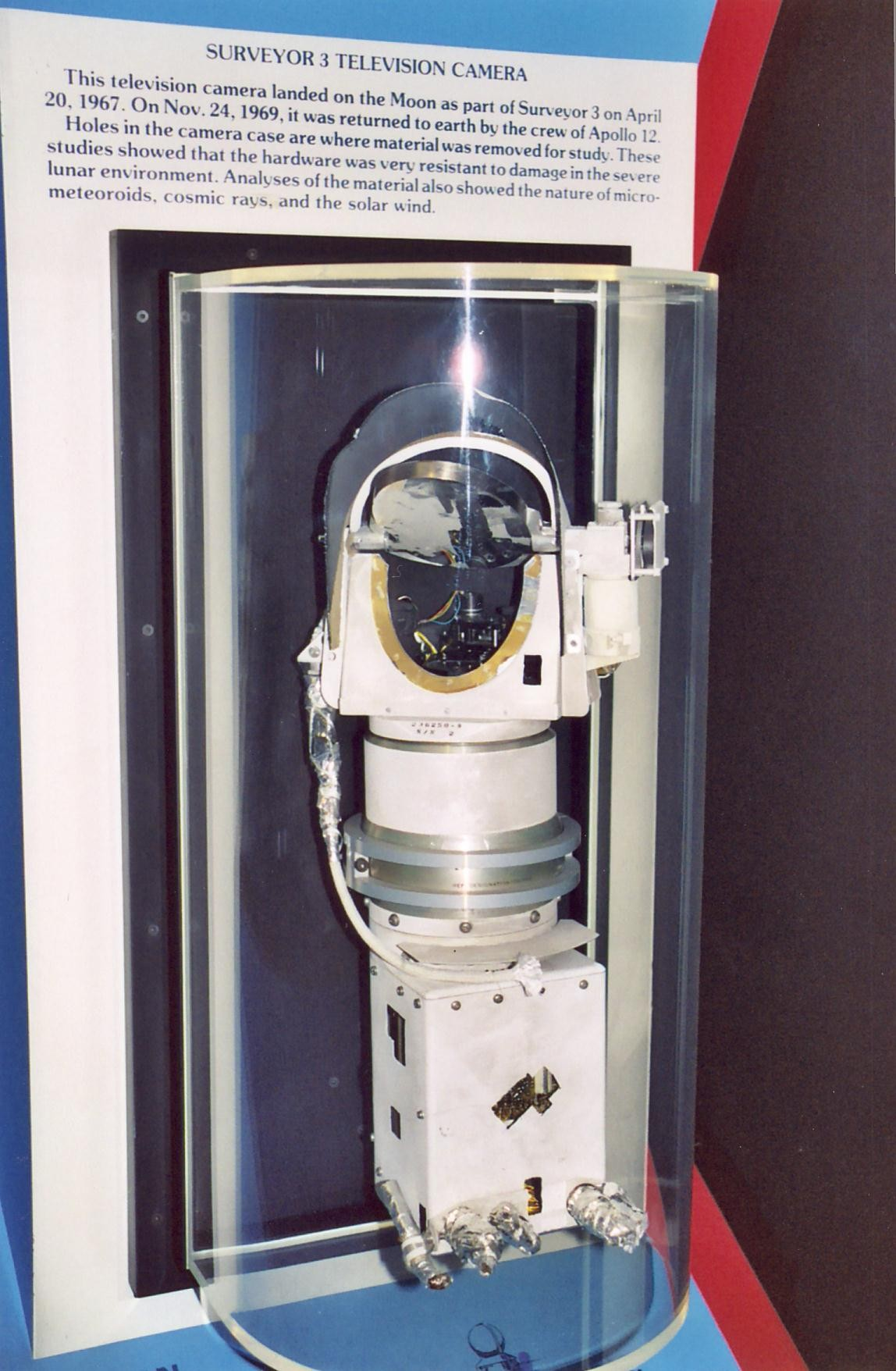
Surveyor 3 camera brought back from the Moon by Apollo 12, on display at NASM

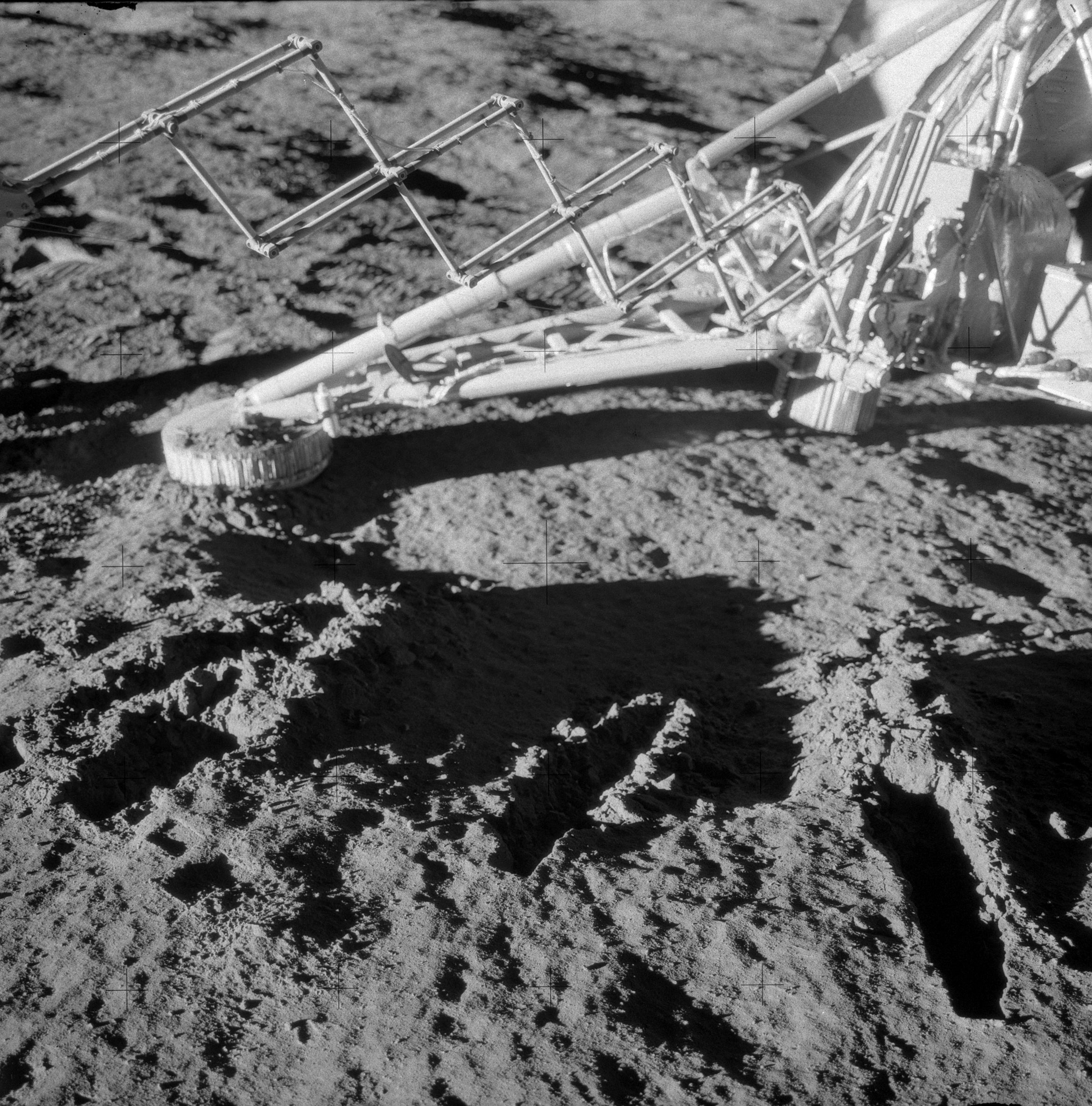
Surveyor 3 scoops, photographed by the Apollo 12 astronauts

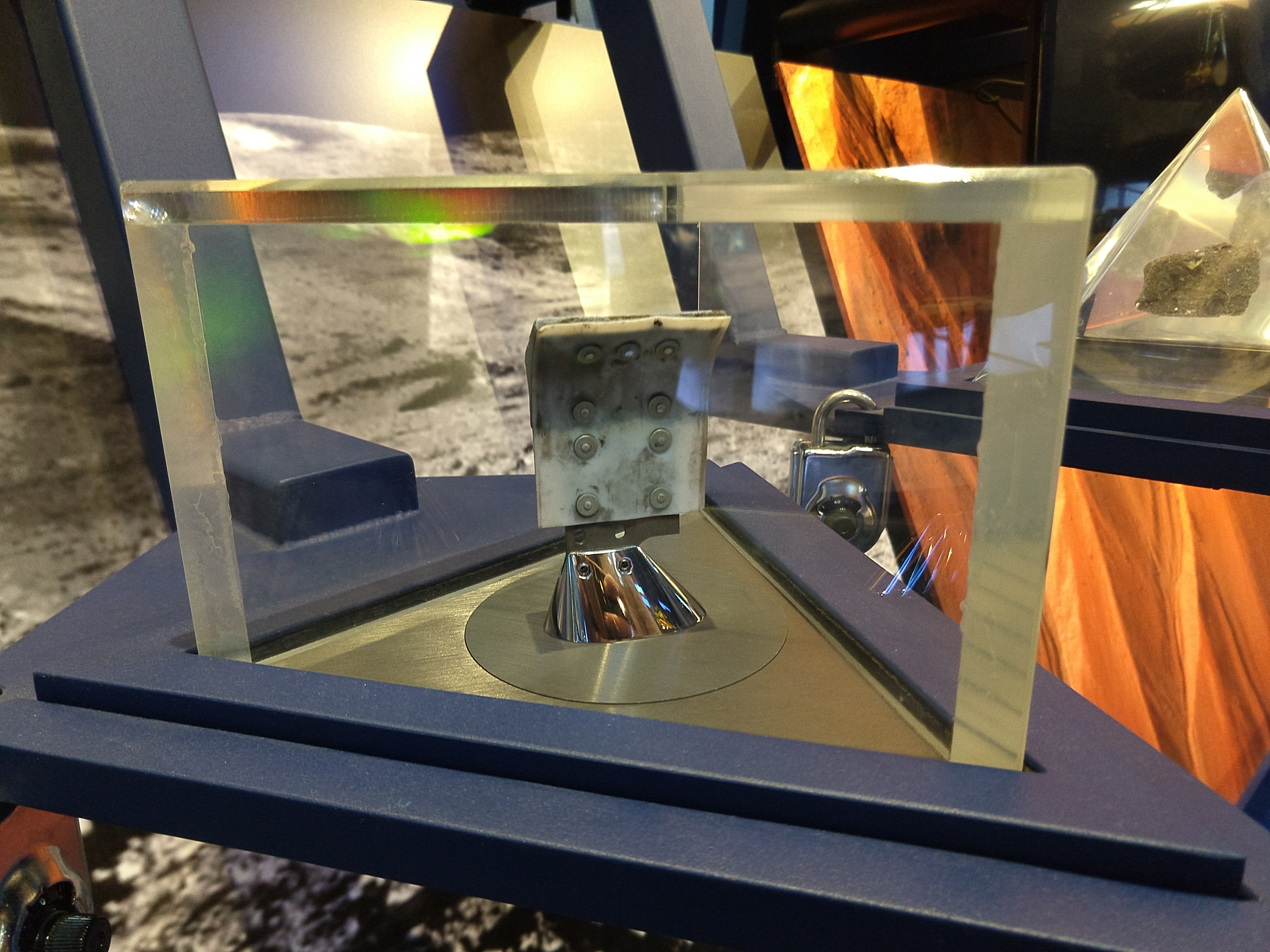
Soil mechanics surface sampler from the Surveyor 3 spacecraft returned to Earth by the crew of Apollo 12

== Apollo 12 visit and possible camera contamination ==
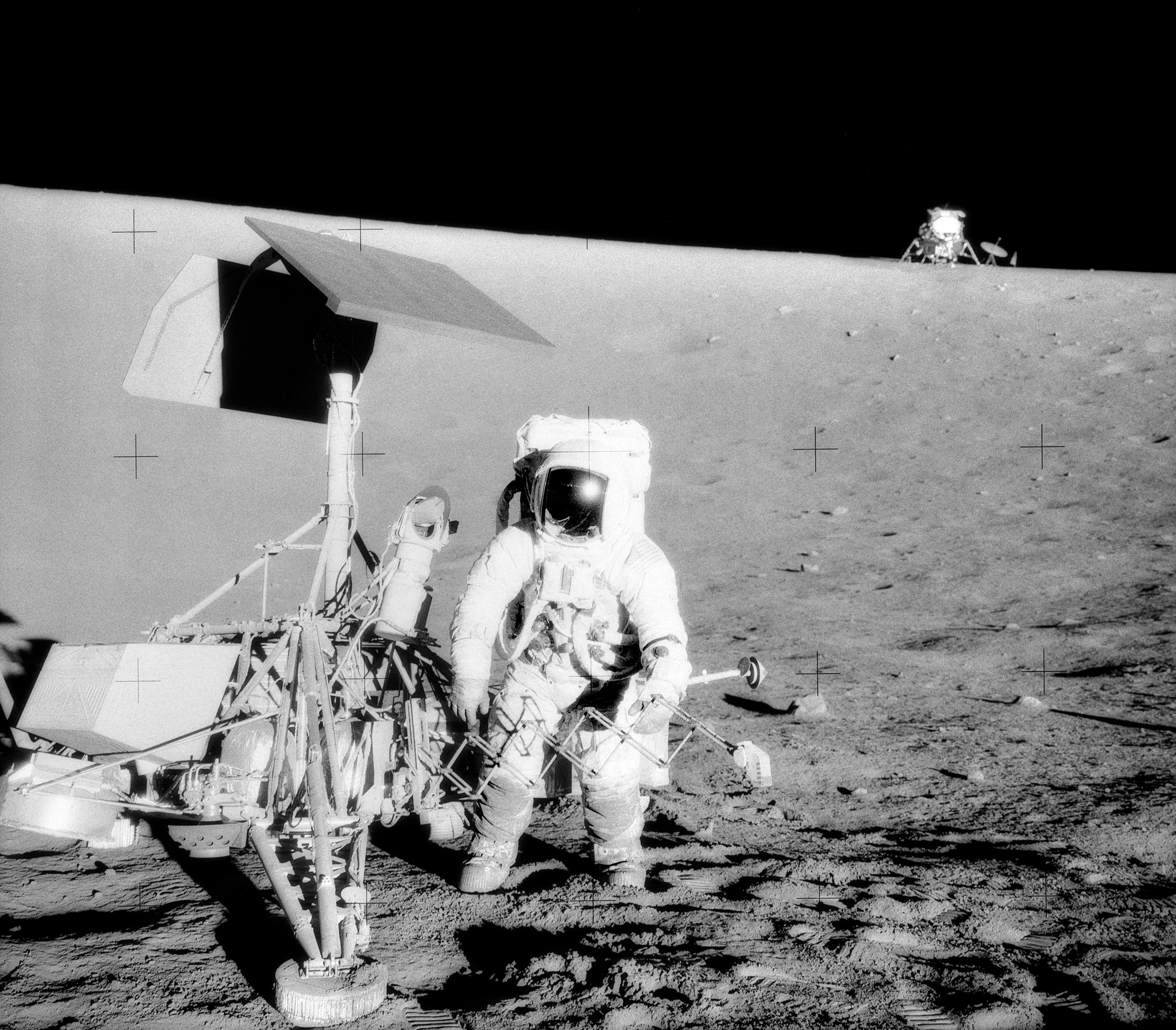
Charles Conrad Jr., Apollo 12 Commander, stands next to Surveyor 3. In the background is the Apollo 12 Lunar Module, Intrepid. Alan L. Bean, the Lunar Module pilot of Apollo 12 captured the image.

The Surveyor 3 landing site was later selected also as the landing target for the Lunar Module of the Apollo 12 crewed lunar mission in 1969. Several components of the Surveyor 3 lander were collected and returned to the Earth for study of the long-term exposure effects of the harsh lunar environment on human-made objects and materials. Although space probes have returned to Earth in the decades since Apollo 12, this remains the only occasion on which humans have visited a probe that had been sent off-world.

=== Camera contamination ===
It is widely claimed that a common type of bacterium, Streptococcus mitis, accidentally contaminated the Surveyor's camera prior to launch, and that the bacteria survived dormant in the harsh lunar environment for two and a half years, supposedly then to be detected when Apollo 12 brought the Surveyor's camera back to the Earth. This claim has been cited by some as providing credence to the idea of interplanetary panspermia, but more importantly, it led NASA to adopt strict abiotic procedures for space probes to prevent contamination of the planet Mars and other astronomical bodies that are suspected of having conditions possibly suitable for life. Most dramatically, the Galileo space probe was deliberately destroyed at the end of its mission by crashing it into Jupiter, to avoid the possibility of contaminating the Jovian moon Europa with bacteria from Earth. The Cassini probe also impacted Saturn at the end of its mission in 2017.

However, independent investigators have challenged the claim of surviving bacteria on Surveyor 3 on the Moon. There is a possibility the contamination was caused by using a non-airtight container, or when the samples were being taken in the clean room after Apollo 12.

== Lunar Reconnaissance Orbiter ==
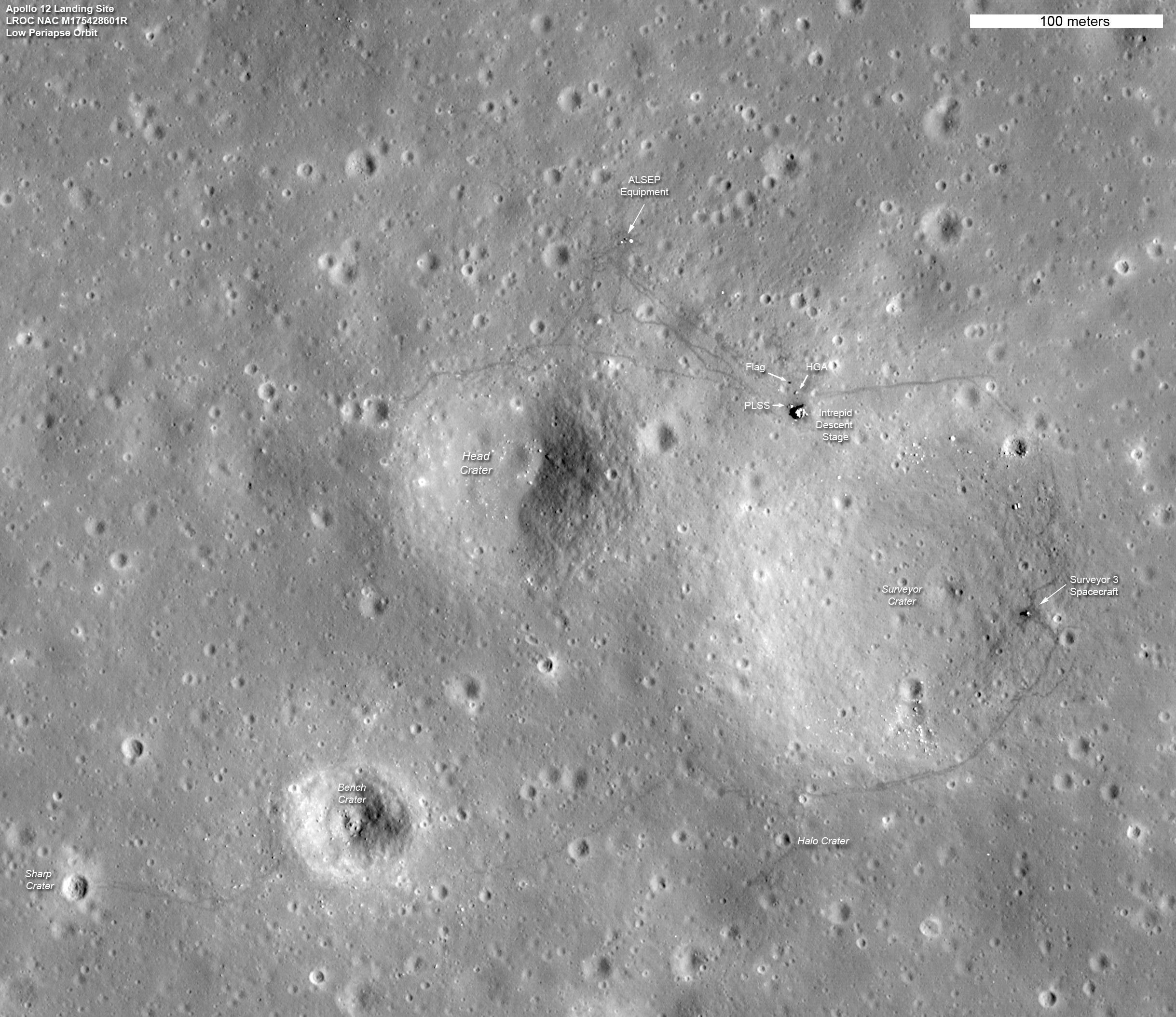
Surveyor and Apollo 12 landing site photographed by Lunar Reconnaissance Orbiter in 2009

In 2009, the Lunar Reconnaissance Orbiter (LRO) photographed the Surveyor 3 landing site in some detail, in which surrounding astronaut foot tracks could also be seen. In 2011, the LRO returned to the landing site at a lower altitude to take higher resolution photographs.

== See also ==
- Planetary protection
- List of artificial objects on the Moon
- List of missions to the Moon
