= Streptococcus mitis =

Scientific classification
- Domain: Bacteria
- Kingdom: Bacillati
- Phylum: Bacillota
- Class: Bacilli
- Order: Lactobacillales
- Family: Streptococcaceae
- Genus: Streptococcus
- Species: S. mitis

Binomial name
- Streptococcus mitis Andrewes and Horder 1906 (Approved Lists 1980)

Synonyms
- Streptococcus mitior

Species of bacterium

Streptococcus mitis is a species of Gram-positive, mesophilic, alpha-hemolytic bacteria in the genus Streptococcus, belonging to the viridans streptococci group. These bacteria are facultative anaerobes, and made up of non-motile and non-sporing cocci (round cells) that are catalase negative. It is a commensal and commonly inhabits the human mouth, throat, and upper respiratory tract, as part of the oral microbiota. They are clinically important for humans, as under certain conditions, it can cause opportunistic infections, such as infective endocarditis.

== Classification ==
Members of the Streptococcus genera belong to lactic acid bacteria defined by the formation of lactic acid as an end-product of carbohydrate metabolism. The family Streptococcaceae is characterized by based upon its 16S rRNA gene sequence analysis within the low (< 50 mol%) G+C branch. There are over 50 species in the genus which are classified by their 16S rRNA sequences.

== Ecology ==
Streptococcus mitis primarily resides in the oral cavity which includes the mouth, nasopharynx, and throat. However, there have also been cases of it in the female genital tract, the gastrointestinal tract, and even on the skin.

S. mitis can cause opportunistic infections, which can be severe. However, S. mitis colonization in the intestines may lessen the severity of ulcerative colitis.

== Natural genetic transformation ==
S. mitis is competent for natural genetic transformation. Thus S. mitis cells are able to take up exogenous DNA and incorporate exogenous sequence information into their genome by homologous recombination. These bacteria can employ a predatory fratricidal mechanism for active acquisition of homologous DNA.

== Moon Surveyor 3 probe ==
=== Approach ===
It has been reported that Streptococcus mitis identified and survived for over two years on the Surveyor 3 probe on the Moon. However, NASA stated that this is most probably due to contamination upon return to Earth. The Apollo 12 crew received pieces of Surveyor in 1969, one of these was the TV camera. The probe was then analyzed to consider how the lunar environment affected the material. Surveyor 3 had not been sterilized before its launch because scientists wanted to see if organisms could survive the two and half years on the Moon, so looking for surviving organic material was a part of this analysis.

=== Results ===
Upon inspection, a group found an amount of S. mitis inside a piece of foam located inside the camera. Culture plates were made and the identity was later confirmed as Streptococcus mitis at the US Communicable Disease Center at Atlanta, Georgia. At first, it was speculated that S. mitis had been picked up from the Moon but research later discovered that the residence of the bacteria on the probe had started after the probe returned.

== Characteristics of Streptococcus mitis ==
The following table has Streptococcus mitis characteristics
Test type	Test	Characteristics
Biochemical characters	Gram stain	Positive
Biochemical characters	Catalase	Negative
Biochemical characters	Oxidase	Negative
Biochemical characters	Methyl Red	Positive
Biochemical characters	Voges Proskauer (VR)	Negative
Biochemical characters	Coagulase	Negative
Biochemical characters	DNase	Negative
Morphological characters	Shape	Coccus
Morphological characters	Arrangement	Chains or pairs
Fermentation	Glucose	Positive
Fermentation	Fructose	Positive
Fermentation	Galactose	Positive
Fermentation	Lactose	Positive
Fermentation	Maltose	Negative
Fermentation	Mannitol	Variable
Fermentation	Mannose	Positive
Fermentation	Sucrose	Positive
Fermentation	Starch	Negative
Enzymatic Reactions	Acetoin	Negative
Enzymatic Reactions	Acid Phosphatase	Variable
Enzymatic Reactions	Alkaline Phosphatase	Positive
Enzymatic Reactions	Hyaluronidase	Negative
Enzymatic Reactions	β-D-glucosidase	Positive
Enzymatic Reactions	Leucine aminopeptidase	Positive
Enzymatic Reactions	Neuraminidase	Positive
