= Hemolysis (microbiology) =

Breakdown of red blood cells

Hemolyses of Streptococcus spp. (left, tracing the letter α) α-hemolysis (S. mitis); (middle, tracing β) β-hemolysis (S. pyogenes); (right, tracing γ) γ-hemolysis (non-hemolytic, S. salivarius)

Hemolysis is the breakdown of red blood cells. The ability of bacterial colonies to induce hemolysis when grown on blood agar is used to classify certain microorganisms. This is particularly useful in classifying streptococcal species. A substance that causes hemolysis is called a hemolysin.

== Types ==
=== Alpha-hemolysis ===
When alpha-hemolysis (α-hemolysis) is present, the agar under the colony is light and greenish. Streptococcus pneumoniae and a group of oral streptococci (Streptococcus viridans or viridans streptococci) display alpha-hemolysis. This is sometimes called green hemolysis because of the color change in the agar. Other synonymous terms are incomplete hemolysis and partial hemolysis. Alpha-hemolysis is caused by the bacteria's production of hydrogen peroxide, which oxidizes hemoglobin and produces the green oxidized derivative methemoglobin.

=== Beta-hemolysis ===
Beta-hemolysis (β-hemolysis), sometimes called complete hemolysis, is a complete lysis of red cells in the media around and under the colonies: the area appears lightened (yellow) and transparent. Streptolysin, an exotoxin, is the enzyme produced by the bacteria which causes the complete lysis of red blood cells. There are two types of streptolysin: streptolysin O (SLO) and streptolysin S (SLS). Streptolysin O is an oxygen-sensitive cytotoxin secreted by most Group A streptococcus (GAS) and Streptococcus dysgalactiae; it interacts with cholesterol in the membrane of eukaryotic cells (mainly red and white blood cells, macrophages, and platelets), usually resulting in β-hemolysis under the surface of blood agar. Streptolysin S is an oxygen-stable cytotoxin also produced by most GAS strains which results in clearing on the surface of blood agar. SLS affects immune cells, including polymorphonuclear leukocytes and lymphocytes, and is thought to prevent the host immune system from clearing infection. Streptococcus pyogenes, or Group A beta-hemolytic Strep (GAS), as well as Streptococcus agalactiae display beta-hemolysis.

The hemolysis of some weakly beta-hemolytic organisms is enhanced when streaked close to certain beta hemolytic strains of Staphylococcus aureus. This phenomenon is the mechanism behind the CAMP test, a test that was historically used for the identification of Streptococcus agalactiae and Listeria monocytogenes. A modified version of this test called the reverse CAMP test, utilizing S. agalactiae instead of S. aureus, can also be used to identify Clostridium perfringens.

=== Gamma-hemolysis ===
If an organism does not induce hemolysis, the agar under and around the colony is unchanged and the organism is called non-hemolytic or said to display gamma-hemolysis (γ-hemolysis). Enterococcus faecalis (formerly called "Group D Strep"), Staphylococcus saprophyticus, and Staphylococcus epidermidis display gamma-hemolysis.

== Hemodigestion ==
When some otherwise non-hemolytic bacteria, such as strains of the cholera-causing bacteria Vibrio cholerae, are plated on blood agar, no clearings are observed surrounding the isolated colonies, but the blood surrounding larger areas of growth turns green. This process, called hemodigestion, is caused by the metabolic by-products of the bacteria in aerobic conditions.
