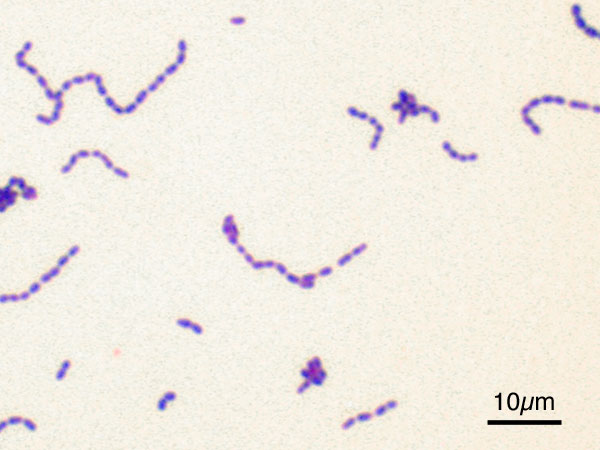
- Streptococcus mutans

Scientific classification
- Domain: Bacteria
- Kingdom: Bacillati
- Phylum: Bacillota
- Class: Bacilli
- Order: Lactobacillales
- Family: Streptococcaceae; Deibel & Seeley 1974

Genera
- Floricoccus; Lactococcus; Lactovum; Okadaella; Streptococcus

Synonyms
- "Mogalliidae" corrig. Enderlein 1917; "Pseudostreptoideae" corrig. Enderlein 1917; "Streptococceae" De Toni & Trevisan 1889

= Streptococcaceae =

Family of bacteria

Streptococcaceae, from Ancient Greek στρεπτός (streptós), meaning "twisted", and κόκκος (kókkos), meaning "grain", are a family of gram-positive bacteria, placed within the order Lactobacillales. Representative genera include Lactococcus, Lactovum, and Streptococcus.

== Phylogeny ==
The currently accepted taxonomy is based on the List of Prokaryotic names with Standing in Nomenclature (LPSN) and National Center for Biotechnology Information (NCBI).

16S rRNA based LTP_10_2024

- - Pilibacter Higashiguchi et al. 2006
  - - Streptococcaceae
      - - Floricoccus Chuah et al. 2017
        - - Lactococcus~
          - - - Lactovum Matthies et al. 2005
              - Lactococcus termiticola Noda et al. 2018
            - Lactococcus Beijerinck 1901 ex Schleifer et al. 1986
      - Streptococcus Billroth 1874 ex Rosenbach 1884

120 marker proteins based GTDB 09-RS220

- Streptococcaceae
  - Pilibacter
  - - - Floricoccus
      - - Lactococcus_A
        - - Lactovum
          - Lactococcus
    - Streptococcus

== See also ==
- List of Bacteria genera
- List of bacterial orders
