= List of clinically important bacteria =

This is a list of bacteria that are significant in medicine. For a list of clinically important viruses, see the table of viral diseases.

== A ==
- Acinetobacter
  - Acinetobacter baumannii
- Actinomyces
  - Actinomyces israelii
  - Actinomyces gerencseriae
- Agrobacterium radiobacter
- Agrobacterium tumefaciens
- Anaplasma
  - Anaplasma phagocytophilum
  - Anaplasma sparouinense
- Arcanobacterium haemolyticum
- Azorhizobium caulinodans
- Azotobacter vinelandii

== B ==
- Bacillus
  - Bacillus anthracis
  - Bacillus brevis
  - Bacillus cereus
  - Bacillus fusiformis
  - Bacillus licheniformis
  - Bacillus megaterium
  - Bacillus mycoides
  - Bacillus stearothermophilus
  - Bacillus subtilis
  - Bacillus thuringiensis
- Bacteroides
  - Bacteroides fragilis
  - Bacteroides gingivalis
- Bartonella
  - Bartonella henselae
  - Bartonella quintana (formerly Rickettsia quintana)
- Bordetella
  - Bordetella bronchiseptica
  - Bordetella parapertussis
  - Bordetella pertussis
- Borrelia burgdorferi
- Brucella
  - Brucella abortus
  - Brucella melitensis
  - Brucella suis
- Burkholderia
  - Burkholderia mallei
  - Burkholderia pseudomallei
  - Burkholderia cepacia

== C ==
- Calymmatobacterium granulomatis
- Campylobacter
  - Campylobacter coli
  - Campylobacter fetus
  - Campylobacter jejuni
- Capnocytophaga canimorsus
- Cardiobacterium hominis
- Chlamydia
  - Chlamydia trachomatis
- Chlamydophila
  - Chlamydophila pneumoniae (formerly Chlamydia pneumoniae)
  - Chlamydophila psittaci (formerly Chlamydia psittaci)
- Citrobacter
  - Citrobacter freundii
  - Citrobacter koseri
- Clostridioides difficile (also known as C. diff)
- Clostridium
  - Clostridium botulinum
  - Clostridium novyi
  - Clostridium perfringens (formerly Clostridium welchii)
  - Clostridium septicum
  - Clostridium tetani
- Corynebacterium
  - Corynebacterium diphtheriae (formerly Mycobacterium diphtheriae)
  - Corynebacterium urealyticum
- Coxiella burnetii
- Cutibacterium acnes (formerly Propionibacterium acnes)

== E ==
- Ehrlichia
  - Ehrlichia chaffeensis
  - Ehrlichia ewingii
- Eikenella corrodens
- Elizabethkingia
  - Elizabethkingia meningoseptica
  - Elizabethkingia anophelis
- Enterobacter
  - Enterobacter aerogenes
  - Enterobacter cloacae
- Enterococcus
  - Enterococcus avium
  - Enterococcus casseliflavus
  - Enterococcus durans
  - Enterococcus faecalis
  - Enterococcus faecium
  - Enterococcus gallinarum
  - Enterococcus malodoratus
- Escherichia coli
  - Escherichia coli O157:H7

== F ==
- Finegoldia magna
- Francisella tularensis (formerly Pasteurella tularensis)
- Fusobacterium
  - Fusobacterium necrophorum
  - Fusobacterium nucleatum (formerly Corynebacterium fusiforme)
- Frateuria aurantia (formerly Acetobacter aurantius)

== G ==
- Gardnerella vaginalis
- Grimontia hollisae

== H ==
- Haemophilus
  - Haemophilus ducreyi
  - Haemophilus influenzae
  - Haemophilus parainfluenzae
  - Haemophilus vaginalis
- Helicobacter pylori

== K ==
- Kingella kingae
- Klebsiella
  - Klebsiella granulomatis
  - Klebsiella oxytoca
  - Klebsiella pneumoniae

== L ==
- Lactobacillus
  - Lactobacillus acidophilus
  - Lactobacillus bulgaricus
  - Lactobacillus casei
  - Lactococcus lactis
- Legionella pneumophila
- Leptospira
  - Leptospira interrogans
  - Leptospira noguchii
- Listeria monocytogenes

== M ==
- Methanobacterium extroquens
- Micrococcus luteus
- Moraxella catarrhalis
- Morganella morganii
- Mycobacterium
  - Mycobacterium avium
  - Mycobacterium bovis
  - Mycobacterium intracellulare
  - Mycobacterium kansasii
  - Mycobacterium leprae
  - Mycobacterium lepraemurium
  - Mycobacterium marinum
  - Mycobacterium phlei
  - Mycobacterium smegmatis
  - Mycobacterium tuberculosis
- Mycoplasma
  - Mycoplasma fermentans
  - Mycoplasma genitalium
  - Mycoplasma hominis
  - Mycoplasma penetrans
  - Mycoplasma pneumoniae

== N ==
- Neisseria
  - Neisseria gonorrhoeae
  - Neisseria meningitidis
  - Neisseria weaveri
- Nocardia
  - Nocardia asteroides
  - Nocardia brasiliensis
  - Nocardia cyriacigeorgica
  - Nocardia farcinica

== P ==
- Pasteurella
  - Pasteurella canis
  - Pasteurella multocida
- Peptostreptococcus anaerobius
- Photobacterium damselae subsp. damselae (previously Vibrio damsela)
- Porphyromonas gingivalis
- Prevotella melaninogenica (formerly Bacteroides melaninogenicus)
- Proteus
  - Proteus mirabilis
  - Proteus penneri
  - Proteus vulgaris
- Pseudomonas aeruginosa

== R ==
- Rhizobium radiobacter
- Rickettsia
  - Rickettsia prowazekii
  - Rickettsia psittaci
  - Rickettsia rickettsii
  - Rickettsia trachomae
- Rochalimaea
  - Rochalimaea henselae
  - Rochalimaea quintana
- Rothia dentocariosa

== S ==
- Salmonella
  - Salmonella enteritidis
  - Salmonella typhi
  - Salmonella typhimurium
- Serratia marcescens
- Shewanella algae
- Shigella
  - Shigella dysenteriae
  - Shigella sonnei
- Spirillum volutans
- Staphylococcus
  - Staphylococcus aureus
    - Methicillin-resistant Staphylococcus aureus
  - Staphylococcus epidermidis
  - Staphylococcus lugdunensis
  - Staphylococcus saprophyticus
- Stenotrophomonas maltophilia
- Streptococcus
  - Streptococcus agalactiae
  - Streptococcus anginosus
  - Streptococcus avium
  - Streptococcus bovis
  - Streptococcus constellatus
  - Streptococcus cricetus
  - Streptococcus ferus
  - Streptococcus intermedius
  - Streptococcus lactis
  - Streptococcus mitior
  - Streptococcus mitis
  - Streptococcus mutans
  - Streptococcus oralis
  - Streptococcus pneumoniae
  - Streptococcus pyogenes
  - Streptococcus rattus
  - Streptococcus salivarius
  - Streptococcus sobrinus
- Streptomyces avermitilis

== U ==
- Ureaplasma urealyticum

== V ==
- Vibrio
  - Vibrio cincinnatiensis
  - Vibrio cholerae
  - Vibrio metschnikovii
  - Vibrio navarrensis
  - Vibrio parahaemolyticus
  - Vibrio vulnificus

== W ==
- Wolbachia

== Y ==
- Yersinia
  - Yersinia enterocolitica
  - Yersinia pestis
  - Yersinia pseudotuberculosis

== See also ==
- List of bacterial orders
- List of bacteria genera
- List of human diseases associated with infectious pathogens
