= List of antibiotic-resistant bacteria =

The evolution of bacteria on a "Mega-Plate" petri dish

A list of antibiotic resistant bacteria is provided below. These bacteria have shown antibiotic resistance (or antimicrobial resistance).

== Gram positive ==
=== Clostridioides difficile ===
Clostridioides difficile is a nosocomial pathogen that causes diarrheal disease worldwide. Diarrhea caused by C. difficile can be life-threatening. Infections are most frequent in people who have had recent medical and/or antibiotic treatment. C. difficile infections commonly occur during hospitalization.

According to a 2015 CDC report, C. difficile caused almost 500,000 infections in the United States per year. Associated with these infections were an estimated 15,000 deaths. The CDC estimates that C. difficile infection costs could amount to $3.8 billion over five years.

C. difficile colitis is most strongly associated with fluoroquinolones, cephalosporins, carbapenems, and clindamycin.

Some research suggests the overuse of antibiotics in the raising of livestock is contributing to outbreaks of bacterial infections such as C. difficile.[16]

Antibiotics, especially those with a broad activity spectrum (such as clindamycin) disrupt normal intestinal flora. This can lead to an overgrowth of C. difficile, which flourishes under these conditions. Pseudomembranous colitis can follow, creating generalized inflammation of the colon and the development of "pseudomembrane", a viscous collection of inflammatory cells, fibrin, and necrotic cells.[4] Clindamycin-resistant C. difficile was reported as the causative agent of large outbreaks of diarrheal disease in hospitals in New York, Arizona, Florida, and Massachusetts between 1989 and 1992. Geographically dispersed outbreaks of C. difficile strains resistant to fluoroquinolone antibiotics, such as ciprofloxacin and levofloxacin, were also reported in North America in 2005.

=== Enterococcus ===
Multidrug-resistant Enterococcus faecalis and Enterococcus faecium are associated with nosocomial infections. These strains include: penicillin-resistant Enterococcus, vancomycin-resistant Enterococcus, and linezolid-resistant Enterococcus.

=== Mycobacterium tuberculosis ===
Tuberculosis (TB) resistant to antibiotics is called MDR TB (multidrug-resistant TB). Globally, MDR TB causes 150,000 deaths annually. The rise of the HIV/AIDS epidemic has contributed to this.

Mycobacterium tuberculosis is an obligate pathogen that has evolved to ensure its persistence in human populations. This is evident in that Mycobacterium tuberculosis must cause a pulmonary disease in order to be successfully transmitted from one person to another. Tuberculosis, better known as TB, has one of the highest mortality rates among pathogens in the world. Mortality rates have not seen a significant decrease due to its growing resistance to certain antibiotics. Although years of research have been devoted to the creation of a vaccine, one still does not exist. TB is extremely transmissible, contributing significantly to its very high level of virulence. TB was considered one of the most prevalent diseases, and did not have a cure until the discovery of streptomycin by Selman Waksman in 1943. However, the bacteria soon developed resistance. Since then, drugs such as isoniazid and rifampin have been used. M. tuberculosis develops resistance to drugs by spontaneous mutations in its genomes. These types of mutations can lead to genotype and phenotype changes that can contribute to reproductive success, leading to the evolution of resistant bacteria. Resistance to one drug is common, and this is why treatment is usually done with more than one drug. Extensively drug-resistant TB (XDR TB) is TB that is also resistant to the second line of drugs.

Resistance of Mycobacterium tuberculosis to isoniazid, rifampin, and other common treatments has become an increasingly relevant clinical challenge. Evidence is lacking for whether these bacteria have plasmids. M. tuberculosis lack the opportunity to interact with other bacteria in order to share plasmids.

=== Mycoplasma genitalium ===
Mycoplasma genitalium is a small pathogenic bacterium that lives on the ciliated epithelial cells of the urinary and genital tracts in humans. It is still controversial whether or not this bacterium is to be recognized as a sexually transmitted pathogen. Infection with Mycoplasma genitalium sometimes produces clinical symptoms, or a combination of symptoms, but sometimes can be asymptomatic. It causes inflammation in the urethra (urethritis) both in men and women, which is associated with mucopurulent discharge in the urinary tract, and burning while urinating.

Treatment of Mycoplasma genitalium infections is becoming increasingly difficult due to rapidly developing multi-drug resistance, and diagnosis and treatment is further hampered by the fact that M. genitalium infections are not routinely detected. Azithromycin is the most common first-line treatment, but the commonly used 1 gram single-dose azithromycin treatment can lead to the bacteria commonly developing resistance to azithromycin. An alternative five-day treatment with azithromycin showed no development of antimicrobial resistance. Efficacy of azithromycin against M. genitalium has decreased substantially, which is thought to occur through SNPs in the 23S rRNA gene. The same SNPs are thought to be responsible for resistance against josamycin, which is prescribed in some countries. Moxifloxacin can be used as a second-line treatment in case azithromycin is not able to eradicate the infection. However, resistance against moxifloxacin has been observed since 2007, thought to be due to parC SNPs. Tetracyclines, including doxycycline, have a low clinical eradication rate for M. genitalium infections. A few cases have been described where doxycycline, azithromycin and moxifloxacin had all failed, but pristinamycin was still able to eradicate the infection.

=== Staphylococcus aureus ===
Staphylococcus aureus is one of the major resistant pathogens. It caused more than 100,000 deaths attributed to AMR in 2019 and MRSA was present in 748,000 global deaths that year. Found on the mucous membranes and the human skin of around a third of the population, it is extremely adaptable to antibiotic pressure. It was one of the earlier bacteria in which penicillin resistance was found, in 1947, just four years after mass-production began. Methicillin was then the antibiotic of choice, but has since been replaced by oxacillin because of significant kidney toxicity. Methicillin-resistant Staphylococcus aureus (MRSA) was first detected in Britain in 1961, and it is now "quite common" in hospitals. MRSA was responsible for 37% of fatal cases of sepsis in the UK in 1999, up from 4% in 1991. Half of all S. aureus infections in the US are resistant to penicillin, methicillin, tetracycline, and erythromycin.

Vancomycin non-susceptible isolates of Staph aureus have been isolated in Asia and the United States. A study performed in 1992 demonstrated that Vancomycin resistance could be transferred from Enterococcus faecalis/faecium to Staph aureus through the transfer of the VanA and VanB genes.

=== Streptococcus ===
Streptococcus pyogenes (Group A Streptococcus: GAS) infections can usually be treated with many different antibiotics. Strains of S. pyogenes resistant to macrolide antibiotics have emerged; however, all strains remain uniformly susceptible to penicillin.

Resistance of Streptococcus pneumoniae to penicillin and other beta-lactams is increasing worldwide. It was identified as one of six leading pathogens for disease associated with resistance in 2019 and that year there were 596,000 deaths globally of people with drug-resistant infection from the pathogen. The major mechanism of resistance involves the introduction of mutations in genes encoding penicillin-binding proteins. Selective pressure is thought to play an important role, and use of beta-lactam antibiotics has been implicated as a risk factor for infection and colonization. S. pneumoniae is responsible for pneumonia, bacteremia, otitis media, meningitis, sinusitis, peritonitis and arthritis.

== Gram negative ==
=== Campylobacter ===
Campylobacter causes diarrhea (often bloody), fever, and abdominal cramps. Serious complications such as temporary paralysis can also occur. Physicians rely on ciprofloxacin and azithromycin for treating patients with severe disease although Campylobacter is showing resistance to these antibiotics.

=== Neisseria gonorrhoeae ===
Neisseria gonorrhoeae is a sexually transmitted pathogen that causes gonorrhea, a sexually transmitted disease that can result in discharge and inflammation at the urethra, cervix, pharynx, or rectum. It can cause pelvic pain, pain on urination, penile and vaginal discharge, as well as systemic symptoms. It can also cause severe reproductive complications.

=== Gamma proteobacteria ===
==== Enterobacteriaceae ====
As of 2013 hard-to-treat or untreatable infections of carbapenem-resistant Enterobacteriaceae (CRE), also known as carbapenemase-producing Enterobacteriaceae (CPE), were increasing among patients in medical facilities. CRE are resistant to nearly all available antibiotics. Almost half of hospital patients who get bloodstream CRE infections die from the infection.

===== Klebsiella pneumoniae =====
Klebsiella pneumoniae carbapenemase (KPC)-producing bacteria are a group of emerging highly drug-resistant Gram-negative bacilli causing infections associated with significant morbidity and mortality whose incidence is rapidly increasing in a variety of clinical settings around the world. Klebsiella pneumoniae was identified as one of six leading pathogens for disease associated with resistance in 2019 and that year there were 642,000 deaths globally of people with drug-resistant infection from the pathogen. Klebsiella pneumoniae includes numerous mechanisms for antibiotic resistance, many of which are located on highly mobile genetic elements. Carbapenem antibiotics (heretofore often the treatment of last resort for resistant infections) are generally not effective against KPC-producing organisms.

===== Salmonella and E. coli =====
Infection with Escherichia coli and Salmonella can result from the consumption of contaminated food and polluted water. Both of these bacteria are well known for causing nosocomial (hospital-linked) infections, and often, these strains found in hospitals are antibiotic resistant because of adaptations to wide spread antibiotic use. When both bacteria are spread, serious health conditions arise. Many people are hospitalized each year after becoming infected, with some dying as a result. Since 1993, some strains of E. coli have become resistant to multiple types of fluoroquinolone antibiotics. E. coli was identified as one of the six leading pathogens for deaths associated with resistance in 2019 and that year there were 829,000 deaths globally of people with drug-resistant infection from the pathogen.

Although mutation alone plays a huge role in the development of antibiotic resistance, a 2008 study found that high survival rates after exposure to antibiotics could not be accounted for by mutation alone. This study focused on the development of resistance in E. coli to three antibiotic drugs: ampicillin, tetracycline, and nalidixic acid. The researchers found that some antibiotic resistance in E. coli developed because of epigenetic inheritance rather than by direct inheritance of a mutated gene. This was further supported by data showing that reversion to antibiotic sensitivity was relatively common as well. This could only be explained by epigenetics. Epigenetics is a type of inheritance in which gene expression is altered rather than the genetic code itself. There are many modes by which this alteration of gene expression can occur, including methylation of DNA and histone modification; however, the important point is that both inheritance of random mutations and epigenetic markers can result in the expression of antibiotic resistance genes. Resistance to polymyxins first appear in 2011. An easier way for this resistance to spread, a plasmid known as MCR-1 was discovered in 2015.

==== Acinetobacter ====
Acinetobacter is a gram-negative bacteria that causes pneumonia or bloodstream infections in critically ill patients. Multidrug-resistant Acinetobacter have become very resistant to antibiotics. Acinetobacter baumannii was identified as one of the six leading pathogens for deaths associated with resistance in 2019 and that year there were 423,000 deaths globally of people with drug-resistant infection from the pathogen.

On November 5, 2004, the Centers for Disease Control and Prevention (CDC) reported an increasing number of Acinetobacter baumannii bloodstream infections in patients at military medical facilities in which service members injured in the Iraq/Kuwait region during Operation Iraqi Freedom and in Afghanistan during Operation Enduring Freedom were treated. Most of these showed multidrug resistance (MRAB), with a few isolates resistant to all drugs tested.

===== Pseudomonas aeruginosa =====
Pseudomonas aeruginosa is a highly prevalent opportunistic pathogen. It was identified as one of the six leading pathogens for deaths associated with resistance in 2019 and that year there were 334,000 deaths globally of people with drug-resistant infection from the pathogen. One of the most worrisome characteristics of P. aeruginosa is its low antibiotic susceptibility, which is attributable to a concerted action of multidrug efflux pumps with chromosomally encoded antibiotic resistance genes (e.g., mexAB-oprM, mexXY) and the low permeability of the bacterial cellular envelopes. P. aeruginosa has the ability to produce 4-hydroxy-2-alkylquinolines (HAQs), and it has been found that HAQs have prooxidant effects and overexpressing modestly increased susceptibility to antibiotics. The study experimented with the P. aeruginosa biofilms and found that a disruption of relA and spoT genes produced an inactivation of the Stringent response (SR) in cells with nutrient limitation, which provides cells be more susceptible to antibiotics.

== See also ==
- Antimicrobial resistance
