= List of microorganisms found in sourdough =

Sourdough is a mixture of flour and water inhabited by a symbiosis of lactic acid bacteria and yeasts. It is used in baking to leaven and acidify bread.

== Yeasts ==
- Brettanomyces anomalus (Note: AKA Dekkera anomalus, Brettanomyces anomala)
- Brettanomyces bruxellensis (Note: AKA Dekkera bruxellensis, Brettanomyces lambicus)
- Debaryomyces hansenii
- Epiococcum nigrum
- Geotrichum pandrosioniae
- Hanseniaspora valbyensis
- Huiozyma naganishii (Note: Formerly Kazachstania naganishii, Saccharomyces naganishii)
- Issatchenkia orientalis
- Kazachstania barnettii
- Kluyveromyces marxianus
- Lachancea thermotolerans
- Maudiozyma bulderi (Note: Formerly Kazachstania bulderi, Saccharomyces bulderi)
- Maudiozyma exigua (Note: Formerly Kazachstania exigua, Saccharomyces exiguus) (Note: Also found in Lambic)
- Maudiozyma humilis (Note: Formerly Candida milleri, Candida humilis, Kazachstania humilis)
- Maudiozyma saulgeensis (Note: Formerly Kazachstania saulgeensis)
- Monosporozyma servazzii (Note: Formerly Kazachstania servazzii)
- Monosporozyma unispora (Note: Formerly Kazachstania unispora, Saccharomyces unisporus)
- Nakaseomyces glabratus (Note: Formerly Candida glabrata, Torulopsis glabrata, Cryptococcus glabratus)
- Naumovozyma castellii (Note: Formerly Saccharomyces castellii, Naumovia castellii)
- Pichia cecembensis
- Pichia fermentans
- Pichia kudriavzevii (Note: Formerly Candida Krusei)
- Pichia kluyveri
- Pichia membranifaciens
- Ramirezia boidinii
- Saccharomyces bayanus (Note: Formerly Saccharomyces uvarum)
- Saccharomyces cerevisiae
- Saccharomyces paradoxus
- Saturnispora saitoi (Note: Formerly Pichia saitoi, Williopsis saitoi)
- Torulaspora delbrueckii (Note: Formerly Saccharomyces delbruckii)
- Wickerhamomyces anomalus (Note: Formerly Pichia anomala)
- Yamadazyma diddensiae
- Yarrowia lipolytica

== Bacteria ==
- Bacillus carboniphilus
- Bacillus cereus
- Bacillus ginseng
- Bacillus licheniformis
- Bacillus pumilis
- Bacillus siamensis
- Bacillus stratosphericus
- Bacillus subutilis
- Bacillus thuringiensis
- Bacillus zhangzhouensis
- Staphylococcus capitis
- Staphylococcus aureus

=== Acetic Acid Bacteria ===
- Acetobacter aceti
- Acetobacter ascendens
- Acetobacter cerevisiae
- Acetobacter cibinongensis
- Acetobacter indonesiensis
- Acetobacter malorum
- Acetobacter farinalis
- Acetobacter lambici
- Acetobacter okinawensis
- Acetobacter oryzifermentans
- Acetobacter oryzoeni
- Acetobacter pasteurianus
- Acetobacter syzygii
- Gluconobacter roseus
- Komagataeibacter europaeus
- Komagataeibacter hansenii
- Komagataeibacter medellinensis
- Komagataeibacter saccharivorans
- Komagataeibacter sucrofermentans

=== Enterobacter ===
- Enterococcus casseliflavus
- Enterococcus durans
- Enterococcus faecium
- Enterococcus gilvus
- Enterococcus pseudoavium
- Enterococcus xiangfangensis (Note: First identified in sourdough starter)

=== Lactic Acid Bacteria ===
- Amylolactobacillus amylophilus (Note: Formerly Lactobacillus amylophilus)
- Companilactobacillis nantensis
- Companilactobacillus crustorum (Note: Formerly Lactobacillus crustorum)
- Companilactobacillus farciminis
- Companilactobacillus heilongjiangensis
- Companilactobacillus mindensis (Note: Formerly Lactobacillus mindensis)
- Companilactobacillus natensis
- Companilactobacillus nodensis
- Companilactobacillus paralimentarius
- Companilactobacillus sp. (Note: Previously unidentified; not named)
- Fructilactobacillus fructivorans
- Fructilactobacillus frigidiflavus
- Fructilactobacillus sanfranciscensis (Note: Formerly "Lactobacillus sanfranciscensis", "Lactobacillus brevis var. lindneri")
- Fructilactobacillus vespulae
- Furfurilactobacillus cerealis
- Furfurilactobacillus rossiae
- Furfurilactobacillus siliginis
- Furfurilactobacillus milii
- Lacticaseibacillus casei (Note: Formerly Lactobacillus casei)
- Lacticaseibacillus paracasei
- Lacticaseibacillus rhamnosus
- Lactiplantibacillus paraplantarum
- Lactiplantibacillus pentosus
- Lactiplantibacillus plantarum (Note: Formerly Lactobacillus plantarum)
- Lactiplantibacillus xiangfangensis
- Lactobacillus acetotolerans
- Lactobacillus acidophilus
- Lactobacillus alimentarius
- Lactobacillus amylolyticus
- Lactobacillus amylovorus
- Lactobacillus crispatus
- Lactobacillus delbrueckii subsp. bulgaricus
- Lactobacillus delbrueckii subsp. delbrueckii
- Lactobacillus divergens
- Lactobacillus farciminis
- Lactobacillus fermenti
- Lactobacillus gallinarum
- Lactobacillus graminis
- Lactobacillus helveticus
- Lactobacillus ixorae
- Lactobacillus johnsonii
- Lactobacillus lactis subsp. cremoris (Note: Disputed; see Weiss, Norbert; Schillinger, Ulrich; Kandler, Otto (December 1983). "Lactobacillus lactis, Lactobacillus leichmannii and Lactobacillus bulgaricus, Subjective Synonyms of Lactobacillus delbrueckii, and Description of Lactobacillus delbrueckii subsp. lactis comb. nov. and Lactobacillus delbrueckii subsp. bulgaricus comb. nov". Systematic and Applied Microbiology. 4 (4): 552–557. Bibcode:1983SyApM...4..552W. doi:10.1016/S0723-2020(83)80012-5. PMID 23194812.)
- Lactobacillus leichmannii
- Lactobacillus panis
- Lactobacillus pastorianus
- Lactobacillus pontis
- Lactobacillus rossii
- Lactobacillus secaliphilus
- Lactobacillus uvarum
- Lactococcus lactis
- Latilactobacillus curvatus
- Latilactobacillus sakei
- Lentilactobacillus buchneri
- Lentilactobacillus diolivorans
- Lentilactobacillus farraginis (Note: Formerly Lactobacillus farraginis)
- Lentilactobacillus hilgardii (Note: Formerly Lactobacillus hilgardii)
- Lentilactobacillus parabuchneri
- Leuconostoc citreum
- Leuconostoc holzapferii
- Leuconostoc lactis
- Leuconostoc mesenteroides
- Levilactobacillus acidifarinae
- Levilactobacillus brevis (Note: Formerly Lactobacillus brevis)
- Levilactobacillus hammesii
- Levilactobacillus koreensis
- Levilactobacillus namurensis
- Levilactobasillus lettrarii
- Levilactobacillus parabrevis
- Levilactobacillus spicheri
- Levilactobacillus sp.
- Levilactobacillus zymae
- L. halotolerans
- Ligilactobacillus salivarius
- Limosilactobacillus fermentum (Note: Formerly Lactobacillus fermentum)
- Limosilactobacillus panis
- Limosilactobacillus pontis
- Limosilactobacillus reuteri
- Limosilactobacillus sacaliphilus
- Limosilactobacilus frumenti
- Liquorilactobacillus nagelii
- Loigolactobacillus coryniformins (Note: Formerly Lactobacillus coryniformins)
- Pediococcus acidilactici
- Pediococcus cellicola
- Pediococcus inopinatus
- Pediococcus parvulus
- Pediococcus pentosaceus
- Streptococcus constellatus
- Streptococcus equinus
- Streptococcus suis
- Tetragenococcus halophilus (Note: Formerly Pediococcus. See: Wade, M.E.; Strickland, M.T.; Osborne, J.P.; Edwards, C.G. (2019). "Role of Pediococcus in winemaking". Australian Journal of Grape and Wine Research. 25: 7–24. doi:10.1111/ajgw.12366.)
- Weissella cibaria
- Weissella confusa
- Weissella hellenica
- Weissella kandleri
- Weissella paramesenteroides
- Weissella salipscis
- Weissella viridescens (Note: formerly Lactobacillus viridescens)

== See also ==
- List of sourdough breads
