= Enterococcus solitarius =

Scientific classification
- Domain: Bacteria
- Kingdom: Bacillati
- Phylum: Bacillota
- Class: Bacilli
- Order: Lactobacillales
- Family: Enterococcaceae
- Genus: Enterococcus
- Species: E. solitarius

Binomial name
- Enterococcus solitarius Collins et al. 1989

Species of bacterium

Enterococcus solitarius is a species of the genus Enterococcus. It is gram-positive, catalase-negative, and facultatively anaerobic. It was discovered in 1989 alongside Enterococcus raffinosus and Enterococcus pseudoavium

Transfer to Tetragenococcus has been proposed.
