= Enterococcus avium =

Scientific classification
- Domain: Bacteria
- Kingdom: Bacillati
- Phylum: Bacillota
- Class: Bacilli
- Order: Lactobacillales
- Family: Enterococcaceae
- Genus: Enterococcus
- Species: E. avium

Binomial name
- Enterococcus avium (ex Nowlan and Deibel 1967) Collins et al. 1984

Synonyms
- Streptococcus avium

Species of bacterium

Enterococcus avium is a species of bacteria in the genus Enterococcus that is commonly found in bird feces and may occur in the human gastrointestinal tract similar to other Enterococcus species. Rare cases of invasive and bloodstream infections in humans have been reported.

== Taxonomy ==
The clade of E. avium was first outlined in 1955 as group Q streptococci in the Lancefield classification of Streptococcus isolates, with the species name "Streptococcus avium" being proposed in 1967. The distinction to "group D streptococci", which include Enterococcus faecalis and E. faecium, however remained difficult. Members of both groups were eventually moved to the newly erected genus Enterococcus in 1984.

== Ecology ==
E. avium is frequently found in the gastronintestinal tract and feces of various animals, primarily birds.

== Clinical significance ==
E. avium is an uncommon cause for disease in humans, with a large percentage of isolates from invasive infections occurring together with further typical and opportunistic bacterial pathogens. A report of nine bloodstream infections published in 1993 showed underlying health issues of the gastrointestinal tract for a majority of the examined cases.

Several cases of brain abscesses with E. avium as the sole pathogen, linked to chronic otitis media, have been reported.

=== Antibiotic susceptibility ===
Compared to the common pathogens E. faecium and E. faecalis, strains of E. avium are on average less susceptible to ampicillin and benzylpenicillin.

E. avium is typically sensitive to vancomycin, but emergence of vancomycin resistance is expected to be possible by transfer of resistance genes from communal VRE species. Several cases of Vancomycin resistant strains (VREA) have been reported, some of which were successfully treated with linezolid.
