= Moraviensis =

Moraviensis may refer to:

- Enterococcus moraviensis, species of bacteria
- Pseudomonas moraviensis, species of bacteria
