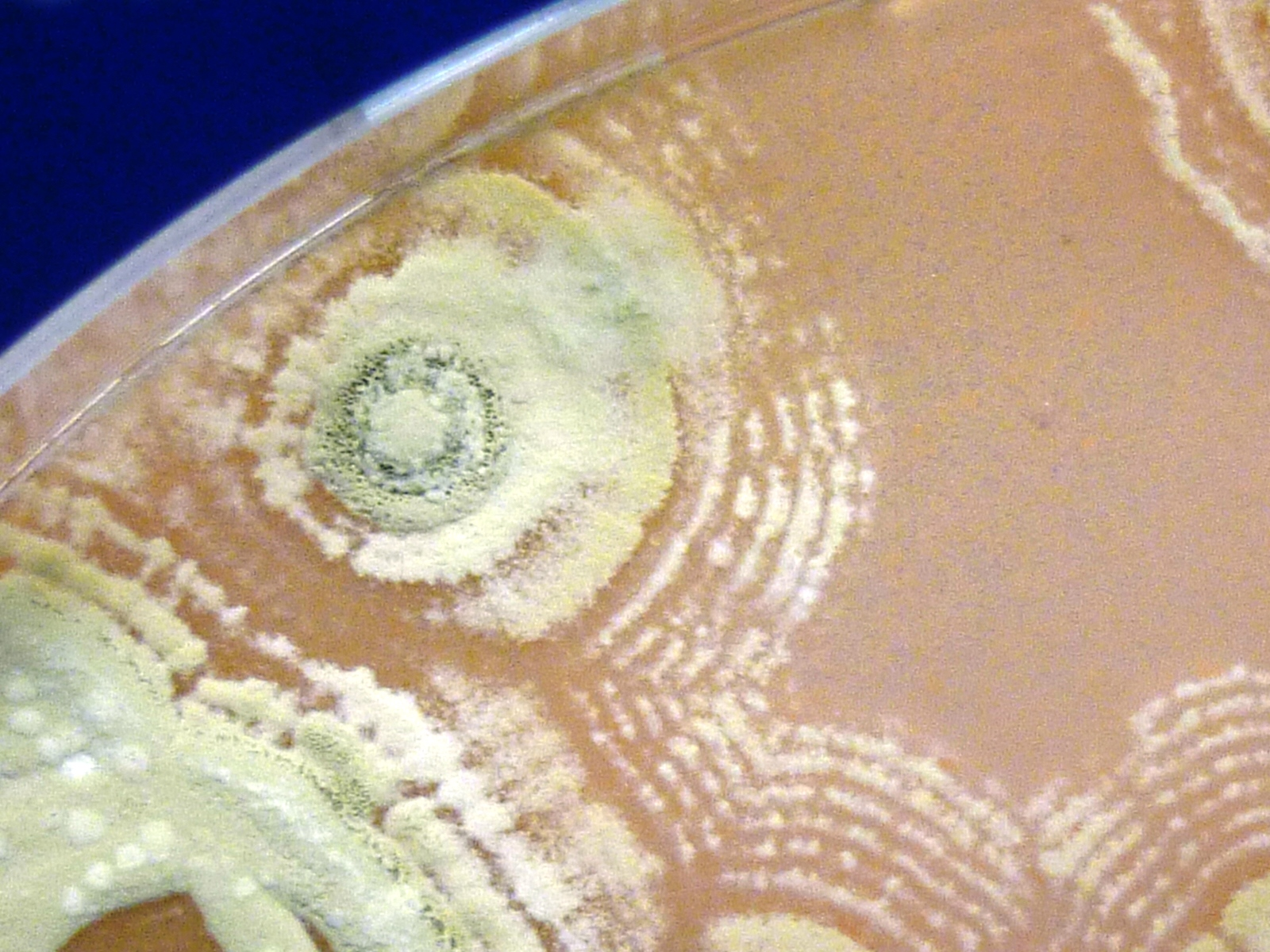
- Mature Streptomyces sp. 'myrophorea' showing dusty green colonies with feint concentric rings

Scientific classification
- Domain: Bacteria
- Kingdom: Bacillati
- Phylum: Actinomycetota
- Class: Actinomycetes
- Order: Streptomycetales
- Family: Streptomycetaceae
- Genus: Streptomyces
- Species: S. sp. 'myrophorea'

Binomial name
- Streptomyces sp. 'myrophorea'

Synonyms
- Streptomyces sp. McG1

= Streptomyces sp. 'myrophorea' =

Species of bacterium

Streptomyces sp. 'myrophorea', isolate McG1 is a species of Streptomyces, that originates from a folk cure (ethnopharmacology) in the townland of Toneel North in Boho, County Fermanagh. This area was previously occupied by the Druids (~1500 years ago) and before this neolithic people (~ 3,700 years ago) who engraved the nearby Reyfad stones. Streptomyces sp. 'myrophorea' is inhibitory to many species of ESKAPE pathogens, can grow at high pH (10.5) and can tolerate relatively high levels of radioactivity.

== Physiology and morphology ==
Streptomyces sp. 'myrophorea' isolate McG1 has light green to white spores and hyphae when cultivated on SFM agar.

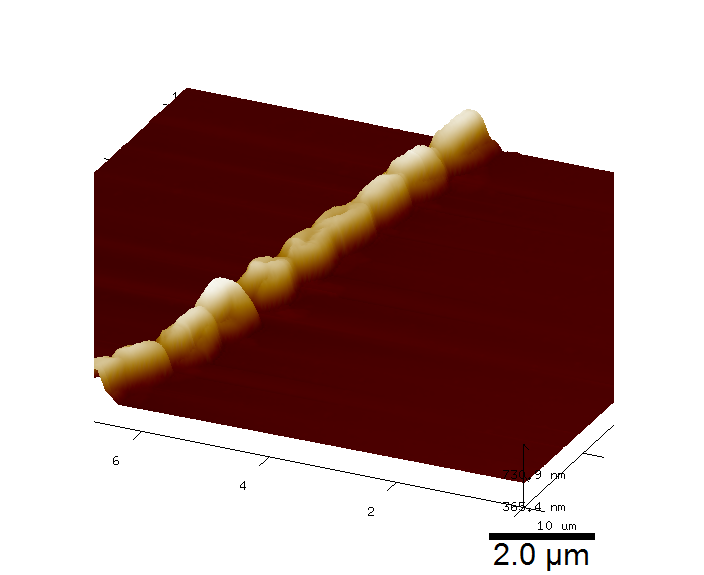
Streptomyces sp. 'myrophorea' spores under atomic force microscopy

The colonies of Streptomyces sp. 'myrophorea' have a distinctly dusty appearance and produce an aroma similar to germaline on maturation. This bacteria produces many spores, approximately 0.5-1.0 micrometers in width which form in straight chains.

== Ecology ==
Streptomyces sp. 'myrophorea' isolate McG1 was discovered in an alkaline, species rich environment. This bacteria grows at a maximum pH of 10.5, and is therefore alkaliphilic. The bacteria tolerate higher levels of alkalinity but do not thrive. Streptomyces sp. 'myrophorea' can also withstand relatively high levels of radiation (up to 4kGy. This may be related to the underlying limestone and shale substrata which emits radon gas.

== Antibiotic production ==
Only antibiotic gene synthesis clusters have been identified in Streptomyces sp. 'myrophorea'; the antibiotics actually produced in-situ have yet to be identified. Streptomyces sp. McG1 is broadly inhibitory to both Gram positive and Gram negative bacteria including carbapenem resistant Acinetobacter baumannii, (a critical pathogen on the World Health Organization priority pathogens list), vancomycin resistant Enterococcus faecium, methicillin resistant Staphylococcus aureus (listed as high priority) and Klebsiella pneumoniae. Streptomyces sp. 'myrophorea' has limited effects against strains of Enterococcus faecium and Pseudomonas aeruginosa.

== Alkaline tolerance ==
Streptomyces sp. 'myrophorea' may be able to flourish in an alkaline environment because it contains many genes similar to those associated with alkaline tolerance in other bacterial species.

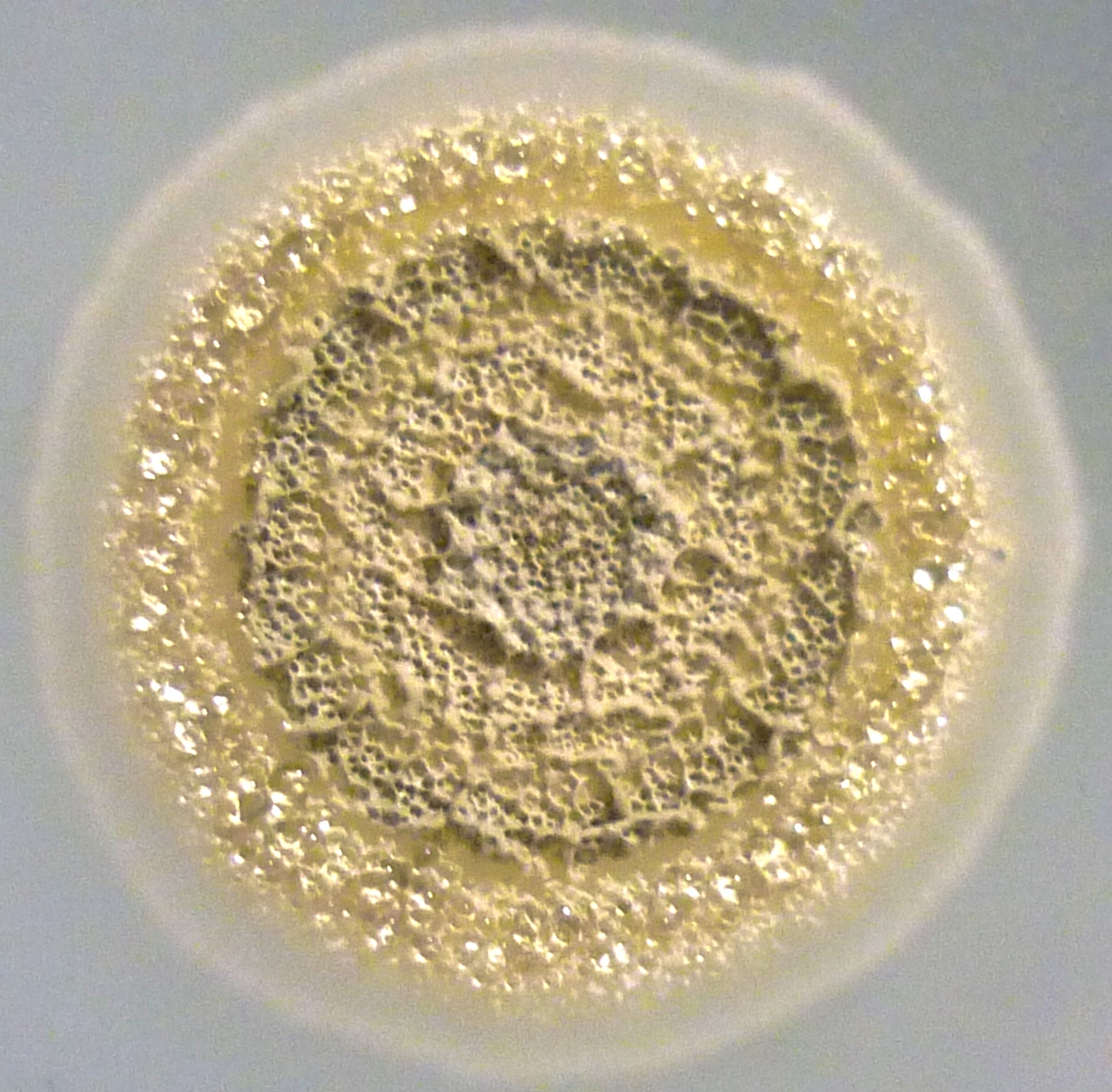
Streptomyces sp. from soil cure, Boho, Co. Fermanagh

Streptomyces sp. 'myrophorea' list of alkaline tolerance genes:

Gene	Protein
504	Alkaline shock protein 23
6561	Alkaline shock protein 23
1049	Ammonium/H+ antiporter subunit amhM
2800	Aspartate/alanine antiporter
2801	Aspartate/alanine antiporter
6218	Aspartate/alanine antiporter
3284	Enhanced intracellular survival protein
159	K+/H+ antiporter nhaP
3788	K+/H+ antiporter nhaP2
1050	K+/H+ antiporter yhaU
2193	K+/H+ antiporter yhaU
1325	K+ insensitive pyrophosphate- energized proton pump
923	Multidrug resistance protein mdtH
3240	Multidrug resistance protein mdtH
3252	Multidrug resistance protein mdtH
6781	Multidrug resistance protein mdtH
1282	Na+/H+ antiporter nhaA
4210	Na+/H+ antiporter subunit A
4211	Na+/H+ antiporter subunit C
4212	Na+/H+ antiporter subunit D
4215	Na+/H+ antiporter subunit G
660	Na+/(H+or K+) antiporter gerN
3425	Na+/(H+or K+) antiporter gerN
7210	putative Na+/H+ exchanger
1727	Sodium, potassium, lithium and rubidium/H+ antiporter

== In-vitro antibiotic resistance ==
The presence of antibiotic resistance genes is often linked to the production of antibiotics. Stretpomyces sp. 'myrophorea' has been recorded to be resistant to 28 antibiotics and sensitive to eight antibiotics in one series of tests. The antibiotics were tested at breakpoint concentrations recommended by The European Committee on Antimicrobial Susceptibility Testing - EUCAST, to test antimicrobial susceptibility.

Antibiotic sensitivity of Streptomyces sp. 'myrophorea': Sensitivities recorded as: Sensitivite (S), Resistant (R) or Intermediate (I).

Antibiotic	Quantity (μg)	Sensitivity
Amikacin	30	S
Ampicillin	30	R
Ampicillin + sulbactam	20	R
Augmentin	30	R
Apromycin	20	R
Carbenicillin	20	R
Cefepime	30	R
Ceftazidime	10	R
Ceftibuten	30	R
Cefoxitin	30	R
Ceftriaxone	30	R
Cefuroxime	30	R
Cefurin	5	R
Ciprofloxacin	5	R
Clavuranic acid	10	R
Ertapenem	10	R
Erythromycin	15	I
Gentamicin	10	S
Imipenem	10	R
Kanamycin	20	R
Linezolid	10	I
Meropenem	10	R
Mupiricin	200	R
Netilmicin	10	S
Nitrofurantoin	100	R
Novobiocin	5	R
Piperacillin + tazobactam	36	R
Quinpristin + dalropristin	5	R
Rifampicin	5	R
Streptomycin	20	R
Tigecycline	15	R
Tetracycline	20	R
Trimethoprim + sulfamethoxazole	25	R
Vancomycin	5	R

== Whole genome sequencing ==
The genome sequence of Streptomyces sp. 'myrophorea', isolate McG1 was deposited at the NCBI (TaxID 2099643), Biosample accession number SAMN08518548, BioProject accession number PRJNA433829, Submission ID: SUB3653175 Locus tag prefix: C4625. https://www.ncbi.nlm.nih.gov/bioproject/433829. Link to NCBI sequence read archive (SRA) https://www.ncbi.nlm.nih.gov/sra?LinkName=biosample_sra&from_uid=8518548 Copies of this bacteria are deposited in the National Collection of Type Cultures (NCTC), UK and the Deutsche Sammlung von Mikroorganismen und Zellkulturen (DSMZ) GmbH, Germany.
