= Aurantia =

Aurantia may refer to:

== Animals ==
- Argiope aurantia, the black and yellow garden spider
- Partula aurantia, a tree snail
- Pseudoeurycea aurantia, a Mexican salamander
- Golden masked owl (Tyto aurantia), a barn owl of New Britain, Papua New Guinea

== Fungi ==
- Aleuria aurantia, the orange peel fungus
- Tremella aurantia, the golden ear fungus

== Plants ==
- Banksia aurantia, a Western Australian shrub

== Places ==
- Aurantia, Florida

== Other ==
- Frateuria aurantia, a bacterium
- Aurantia, an energy firm launched by GreenFuel Technologies Corporation
- Ammonium salt of Hexanitrodiphenylamine, used as a yellow colorant for leather, wool and silk
