= Swimming pool bacteria =

Swimming pool bacteria are the diverse array of bacteria that are present in aquatic environments, primarily swimming pools, which can have effects on human health and water quality. Recreational waters are known to be a source of infectious diseases.

== Types ==
There are different types of bacteria that are found in swimming pools and other types of recreational waters. The most prevalent of them is Staphylococcus aureus (S. aureus). This bacterium is one of the leading causes of skin infections in the world. Such infections could appear as painful boils and rashes. It is naturally present in humans on skin, in nasal mucous, and inside the intestinal tract. S. aureus has a strong resistance to chlorine, which is one of the methods by which pools are often cleaned.

Other bacteria often found in recreational waters are Enterococci, which is a genus of bacteria found in feces. Fecal contamination is one of the primary public health concerns in swimming pools. Fecal contamination usually occurs through excretion by bathers, other animals, or contaminated water sources.

== Levels found in recreational waters ==
Researchers have studied the quantity of bacteria in recreational waters. In a study of swimming pools in Alexandria, Egypt, the team studied 10 pools, both indoor and outdoor, over two months during the summer. The team found that bacteria seemed to be more prevalent in outdoor pools. Furthermore, they noted that the higher the pH of the pool, the more bacteria were present in the water. 20.2% of the bacteria in the pools were found to be S. aureus.

Another study reported two experiments involving a large pool and a small pool. Using 10 volunteers, the team examined how many bacteria could be found in the watershed by the bathers and how many could be found in the water after the bathers were exposed to sand. The study concluded that bathers shed both S. aureus and enterococci into the water, and S. aureus was shed the most. After each cycle, the number of bacteria the bathers shed decreased.

Enterotoxic Escherichia coli has been found in pools with sub-optimal chlorine levels.

== Disease prevention ==
There are several diseases caused by S. aureus and enterococci. S. aureus has been found to cause sepsis and pneumonia, among other problems, while Enterococci has been found to cause sepsis and urinary tract infections, as well as being resistant to antibiotics. There are various actions taken to prevent swimmers from falling ill. The swimming facilities must ensure that their filtration is working and that their staff are trained and know the appropriate behavior and procedures of the facilities. Individual swimmers must also take preventative measures. As stated by the Centers for Disease Control and Prevention (CDC), guests must not swim if they have diarrhea, swimmers should not swallow pool water, swimmers should wash themselves before entering the pool, and if the restroom is used, each guest must thoroughly wash themselves.

In Europe, the cleanliness of pools is monitored by measuring the levels Escherichia coli, enterococci and Pseudomonas aeruginosa. Staphylococcus aureus levels are not monitored despite the detection of the bacteria in recreational waters (and on beaches). The authors of a 2023 study recommended levels of bacteria of 0 CFU/100 mL for water of excellent quality, less than 20 CFU/100 mL for water of very good quality, less than 50 CFU/100 mL for good quality water, and more than 50 CFU/100 mL for poor quality water.
