= ESKAPE =

Six virulent antibiotic-resistant pathogens

ESKAPE is an acronym comprising the scientific names of six highly virulent and antibiotic resistant bacterial pathogens including: Enterococcus faecium, Staphylococcus aureus, Klebsiella pneumoniae, Acinetobacter baumannii, Pseudomonas aeruginosa, and Enterobacter spp. The acronym is sometimes extended to ESKAPEE to include Escherichia coli. This group of Gram-positive and Gram-negative bacteria can evade or 'escape' commonly used antibiotics due to their increasing multi-drug resistance (MDR). As a result, throughout the world, they are the major cause of life-threatening nosocomial or hospital-acquired infections in immunocompromised and critically ill patients who are most at risk.

== Training and awareness manuals ==
In addition to primary research literature, structured training materials have been developed to support understanding of ESKAPE pathogens in public health and biosecurity contexts. One such manual is Demystifying ESKAPE Pathogens (2017), published by the Institute of Nuclear Medicine and Allied Sciences (INMAS), a laboratory of the Defence Research and Development Organisation (DRDO), India.

The manual provides an overview of multidrug-resistant pathogens, including their epidemiology, mechanisms of resistance, transmission, clinical features, and control strategies, and is used in training and awareness programmes in India. P. aeruginosa and S. aureus are some of the most ubiquitous pathogens in biofilms found in healthcare. P. aeruginosa is a Gram-negative, rod-shaped bacterium, commonly found in the gut flora, soil, and water that can be spread directly or indirectly to patients in healthcare settings. The pathogen can also be spread in other locations through contamination, including surfaces, equipment, and hands. The opportunistic pathogen can cause hospitalized patients to have infections in the lungs (as pneumonia), blood, urinary tract, and in other body regions after surgery. S. aureus is a Gram-positive, cocci-shaped bacterium, residing in the environment and on the skin and nose of many healthy individuals. The bacterium can cause skin and bone infections, pneumonia, and other types of potentially serious infections if it enters the body. S. aureus has also gained resistance to many antibiotic treatments, making healing difficult. Because of natural and unnatural selective pressures and factors, antibiotic resistance in bacteria usually emerges through genetic mutation or acquires antibiotic-resistant genes (ARGs) through horizontal gene transfer - a genetic exchange process by which antibiotic resistance can spread.

One of the main reasons for the rise in the selection for antibiotic resistance (ABR) and MDR which led to the emergence of the ESKAPE bacteria is from the rash overuse of antibiotics not only in healthcare, but also in the animal, and agricultural sector. Other key factors include misuse and inadequate adherence to treatment guidelines. Due to these factors, fewer and fewer antibiotic treatments are effective in eradicating ABR and MDR bacterial infections, while at the same time there are now no new antibiotics being created due to lack of funding. These ESKAPE pathogens, along with other antibiotic-resistant bacteria, are an interweaved global health threat and are being addressed from a more holistic and One Health perspective.

== Prevalence ==
From a global perspective, the emergence of multidrug-resistant (MDR) bacteria is responsible for about 15.5% of hospital acquired infection cases and there are currently about 0.7 million deaths from drug-resistant disease. Specifically, the opportunistic nosocomial ESKAPE pathogens correspond with the highest risk of mortality which has the majority of its isolates being MDR. Two pathogens within the ESKAPE group, Carbapenem-resistant Acinetobacter and Carbapenem-resistant Enterobacteriaceae are currently in the top five of the antibiotic resistant bacteria on the CDC's 2019 urgent threat list, and the other 4 pathogens making up the group are on the serious threat list. In addition, the World Health Organization (WHO) created a global priority pathogen list (PPL) of ABR bacteria with the goal to prioritize research and create new effective antibiotic treatments. The global PPL classifies pathogens into 3 categories, critical, high, and medium, and has 4 of the pathogens from the ESKAPE group in the critical priority list and the other 2 pathogens that make up the group in the high priority list.

== Characteristics ==
ESKAPE pathogens are differentiated from other pathogens due to their increased resistance to commonly used antibiotics such as penicillin, vancomycin, carbapenems, and more. This increased resistance, combined with the clinical significance of these bacteria in the medical field, results in a necessity to understand their mechanisms of resistance and combat them with novel antibiotics. Common mechanisms for resistance include the production of enzymes that attack the structure of antibiotics (for example, β-lactamases inactivating β-lactam antibiotics), modification of the target site that the antibiotic targets so that it can no longer bind properly, efflux pumps, and biofilm production. Efflux pumps are a feature of the membrane of Gram-negative bacteria that allows them to constantly pump out foreign material, including antibiotics, so that the inside of the cell never contains a high enough concentration of the drug to have an effect. Biofilms are a mixture of diverse microbial communities and polymers that protect the bacteria from antibiotic treatment by acting as a physical barrier.

== Clinical threats ==
Due to their heightened resistance to frequently used antibiotics, these pathogens pose an additional threat to the safety of the general population, particularly those who frequently interact with hospital environments, as they most commonly contribute to hospital-acquired infections (HAI). The increased antimicrobial resistance profile of these pathogens varies, however they arise from similar causes. One common cause of antibiotic resistance is due to incorrect dosing. When a sub-therapeutic dose is prescribed, or a patient chooses to use less of their prescribed antibiotic, bacteria are given the opportunity to adapt to the treatment. At lower doses, or when a course of antibiotics is not completed, certain strains of the bacteria develop drug-resistant strains through the process of natural selection. This is due to the random genetic mutations that are constantly occurring in many forms of living organisms, bacteria and humans included. Natural selection supports the persistence of strains of bacteria that have developed a certain mutation that allows them to survive. Some strains are also able to participate in inter-strain horizontal gene transfer, allowing them to pass resistance genes from one pathogen to another. This can be particularly problematic in nosocomial infections, where bacteria are constantly exposed to antibiotics and those benefiting from resistance as a result of random genetic mutations can share this resistance with bacteria in the area that have not yet developed this resistance on their own.

== Bacterial profiles ==
=== Enterococcus faecium ===
Enterococcus faecium is a Gram-positive spherically shaped (coccus) bacteria that tends to occur in pairs or chains, most commonly involved in HAI in immunocompromised patients. It often exhibits a resistance to β-lactam antibiotics including penicillin and other last resort antibiotics. There has also been a rise in vancomycin resistant enterococci (VRE) strains, including an increase in E. faecium resistance to vancomycin, particularly vancomycin-A. These vancomycin-resistant strains display a profound ability to develop and share their resistance through horizontal gene transfer, as well as code for virulence factors that control phenotypes. These virulence phenotypes range from thicker biofilms to allowing them to grow in a variety of environments including medical devices such as urinary catheters and prosthetic heart valves within the body. The thicker biofilms act as a "mechanical and biochemical shield" that protects the bacteria from the antibiotics and are the most effective protective mechanism that bacteria have against treatment.

=== Staphylococcus aureus ===
Staphylococcus aureus is a Gram-positive round-shaped (coccus) bacteria that is commonly found as a part of the human skin microbiota and is typically not harmful in humans with non-compromised immune systems in these environments. However, S. aureus has the ability to cause infections when it enters parts of the body that it does not typically inhabit, such as wounds. Similar to E. faecium, S. aureus can also cause infections on implanted medical devices and form biofilms that make treatment with antibiotics more difficult. Additionally, approximately 25% of S. aureus strains secrete the TSST-1 exotoxin responsible for causing toxic shock syndrome. Methicillin-resistant S. aureus, or MRSA, includes strains distinct from other strains of S. aureus in the fact that they have developed resistance to β-lactam antibiotics. Some also express an exotoxin that has been known to cause "necrotic hemorrhagic pneumonia" in those with an infection. Vancomycin and similar antibiotics are typically the first choices for treatment of MRSA infections, however from this vancomycin-resistant S. aureus, or VRSA (VISA for those with intermediate resistance) strains have emerged.

=== Klebsiella pneumoniae ===
Klebsiella pneumoniae is a Gram-negative rod-shaped (bacillus) bacteria that is particularly adept to accepting resistance genes in horizontal gene transfer. It is commonly also resistant to phagocyte treatment due to its thick biofilm with strong adhesion to neighboring cells. Certain strains have also developed β-lactamases that allow them to be resistant many of the commonly used antibiotics, including carbapenems, which has led to the creation of carbapenem-resistant K. pneumoniae (CRKP), for which there are very few antibiotics in development that can treat infection.

=== Acinetobacter baumannii ===
Acinetobacter baumannii is most common in hospitals, which has allowed for the development of resistance to all known antimicrobials. The Gram-negative short-rod-shaped (coccobacillus) A. baumannii thrives in a number of unaccommodating environments due to its tolerance to a variety of temperatures, pHs, nutrient levels, as well as dry environments. The Gram-negative aspects of the membrane surface of A. baumannii, including the efflux pump and outer membrane, affords it a wider range of antibiotic resistance. Additionally, some problematic A. baumannii strains are able to acquire families of efflux pumps from other species, and are commonly first to develop new β-lactamases to improve β-lactam resistance.

=== Pseudomonas aeruginosa ===
The Gram-negative, rod-shaped (bacillus) bacterium Pseudomonas aeurginosa is ubiquitous hydrocarbon degrader that is able to survive in extreme environments as well as in soil and many more common environments. Because of this versatility, it survives quite well in the lungs of patients with late-stage cystic fibrosis (CF). It also benefits from the same previously mentioned Gram-negative resistance factors as A. baumannii. Mutants of P. aeruginosa with upregulated efflux pumps also exist that make finding an effective antibiotic or detergent incredibly difficult. There are also some multi-drug resistant (MDR) strains of P. aeruginosa that express β-lactamases as well as upregulated efflux pumps which can make treatment particularly difficult.

=== Enterobacter ===
Enterobacter encompasses a family of Gram-negative, rod-shaped (bacillus) species of bacteria. Some strains cause urinary tract (UTI) and blood infections and are resistant to multiple drug therapies, which therefore puts the human population in critical need for the development of novel and effective antibiotic treatments. Colistin and tigecycline are two of the only antibiotics currently used for treatment, and there are seemingly no other viable antibiotics in development. In some Enterobacter species, a 5–300-fold increase in minimum inhibitory concentration was observed when exposed to several gradually increasing concentrations of benzalkonium chloride (BAC). Other Gram-negative bacteria (including Enterobacter, but also Acinetobacter, Pseudomonas, Klebsiella species, and more) also displayed a similar ability to adapt to the disinfectant BAC.

== One Health problem ==
The ESKAPE pathogens and ABR bacteria in general are an interconnected global health threat and a clear 'One Health' problem, meaning they can spread between and impact the environment, animal, and human sectors. As one of the largest global health challenges, combatting the highly resistant and opportunistic ESKAPE pathogens necessitates a One Health approach. One Health is a transdisciplinary approach that involves addressing health outcomes from a multifaceted and interdisciplinary perspective for humans, animals, and the environmental on a local, national, and global level. Using this framework and mindset is crucial to combat and prevent the spread and development of the ESKAPE pathogens (including the ABR in general) while addressing its importantly related socioeconomic factors, such as inadequate sanitation. New treatment alternatives for infections caused by ESKAPE are under current scientific research.
