= Enterococcus gallinarum =

Scientific classification
- Domain: Bacteria
- Kingdom: Bacillati
- Phylum: Bacillota
- Class: Bacilli
- Order: Lactobacillales
- Family: Enterococcaceae
- Genus: Enterococcus
- Species: E. gallinarum

Binomial name
- Enterococcus gallinarum (Bridge and Sneath 1982) Collins et al. 1984

Type strain
- PB21

Species of bacterium

Enterococcus gallinarum is a species of Enterococcus. E. gallinarum demonstrates an inherent, low-level resistance to vancomycin. Resistance is due to a chromosomal gene, vanC, which encodes for a terminal D-alanine-D-serine instead of the usual D-alanine-D-alanine in cell wall peptidoglycan precursor proteins. That is a separate mechanism than the vancomycin resistance seen in VRE isolates of E. faecium and E. faecalis which is mediated by vanA or vanB. This species is known to cause clusters of infection, although it considered very rare. It is the only other known enterococcal species besides E. faecium and E. faecalis known to cause outbreaks and spread in hospitals.

A study published in 2018 found that this infectious gut bacterium can translocate (spread) to other organs such as the lymph nodes, liver, and spleen, triggering an autoimmune reaction in humans and mice. E. gallinarum was found during three liver biopsies of individuals with systemic lupus erythematosus and autoimmune liver disease. The autoimmune reaction was found to be suppressed when an intramuscular vaccine or antibiotic was administered.

The bacterium can also cause meningitis, although rare and sepsis.

The antibiotics linezolid, daptomycin and gentamicin, levofloxacin, and penicillin G are effective against the bacteria, depending on the specific isolate.
