= Grimontia sedimenti =

Scientific classification
- Domain: Bacteria
- Kingdom: Pseudomonadati
- Phylum: Pseudomonadota
- Class: Gammaproteobacteria
- Order: Vibrionales
- Family: Vibrionaceae
- Genus: Grimontia
- Species: G. sedimenti

Binomial name
- Grimontia sedimenti Mahmoud et al. 2021

Type strain
- S25

Species of bacterium

Grimontia sedimenti is a Gram-negative, slightly halophilic, facultative anaerobic and mesophilic bacterium species from the genus of Grimontia which has been isolated from benthic sediments near the cost of Kubbar Island.
