= Enterococcus haemoperoxidus =

Scientific classification
- Domain: Bacteria
- Kingdom: Bacillati
- Phylum: Bacillota
- Class: Bacilli
- Order: Lactobacillales
- Family: Enterococcaceae
- Genus: Enterococcus
- Species: E. haemoperoxidus

Binomial name
- Enterococcus haemoperoxidus Švec et al. 2001

Species of bacterium

Enterococcus haemoperoxidus is a species of Enterococcus with type strain CCM 4851^{T} (= LMG 19487^{T}).
