= Enterococcus alcedinis =

Scientific classification
- Domain: Bacteria
- Kingdom: Bacillati
- Phylum: Bacillota
- Class: Bacilli
- Order: Lactobacillales
- Family: Enterococcaceae
- Genus: Enterococcus
- Species: E. alcedinis

Binomial name
- Enterococcus alcedinis Frolková et al. 2013

Type strain
- L34

Species of bacterium

Enterococcus alcedinis is a Gram-positive bacterium from the genus of Enterococcus which has been isolated from the cloaca of a common kingfisher.
