= Enterococcus xinjiangensis =

Scientific classification
- Domain: Bacteria
- Kingdom: Bacillati
- Phylum: Bacillota
- Class: Bacilli
- Order: Lactobacillales
- Family: Enterococcaceae
- Genus: Enterococcus
- Species: E. xinjiangensis

Binomial name
- Enterococcus xinjiangensis Ren et al. 2020

Species of bacterium

Enterococcus xinjiangensis is a Gram-positive bacterium from the genus of Enterococcus which has been isolated from yogurt from Xinjiang.
