= Enterococcus aquimarinus =

Scientific classification
- Domain: Bacteria
- Kingdom: Bacillati
- Phylum: Bacillota
- Class: Bacilli
- Order: Lactobacillales
- Family: Enterococcaceae
- Genus: Enterococcus
- Species: E. aquimarinus

Binomial name
- Enterococcus aquimarinus Svec et al., 2005

Genus of bacteria

Enterococcus aquimarinus is a gram-positive, rod-shaped, aerobic bacterium described in 2005. It was found in sea water has been shown to be highly thermo-tolerant. The type strain of the species is LMG 16607^{T} and 16612 (=CCM 7283^{T}).

== Description ==
Enterococcus aquimarinus have elongated and often lanceolate cells and they occur in pairs or in small groups. This bacteria can be found on different types of food and plants but mostly in water. The bacteria grows the best on ATCC medium 18 however, the type strain LMG 16607^{T} also grows well between 25 °C and 42 °C in the BCCM/LMG culture. In Slanetz and Bartley medium has poor growth, being not motile. Enterococcus aquimarinus has 2,373 genes and about 2,279 protein genes. The analysis of the 16S rRNA gene sequence of one strain shows high similarities with Enterococcus italicus, Enterococcus saccharolyticus, aenterococcus sulfureus and Enterococcus saccharominimus.
