= Grimontia celer =

Scientific classification
- Domain: Bacteria
- Kingdom: Pseudomonadati
- Phylum: Pseudomonadota
- Class: Gammaproteobacteria
- Order: Vibrionales
- Family: Vibrionaceae
- Genus: Grimontia
- Species: G. celer

Binomial name
- Grimontia celer Pujalte et al. 2016

Type strain
- 96-237

Species of bacterium

Grimontia celer is a Gram-negative bacterium species from the genus of Grimontia which has been isolated from sea water.

== Phenotypic characteristics ==
G. celer are curved Gram-negative rods approximately 1.8–2.8 µm in length and 0.5–0.7 µm in width. G. celer is able to tolerate high salt content and grows readily on marine agar. G. celer produces green colonies on TCBS agar, indicating lack of sucrose fermentation. Similar to other Vibrionaceae, G. celer is oxidase positive and catalase positive.
