= Grimontia marina =

Scientific classification
- Domain: Bacteria
- Kingdom: Pseudomonadati
- Phylum: Pseudomonadota
- Class: Gammaproteobacteria
- Order: Vibrionales
- Family: Vibrionaceae
- Genus: Grimontia
- Species: G. marina

Binomial name
- Grimontia marina Choi et al. 2013

Type strain
- IMCC5001

Species of bacterium

Grimontia marina is a Gram-negative, chemoheterotrophic and obligately aerobic bacterium species from the genus of Grimontia which has been isolated from the Yellow Sea.
