= Enterococcus raffinosus =

Scientific classification
- Domain: Bacteria
- Kingdom: Bacillati
- Phylum: Bacillota
- Class: Bacilli
- Order: Lactobacillales
- Family: Enterococcaceae
- Genus: Enterococcus
- Species: E. raffinosus

Binomial name
- Enterococcus raffinosus Collins et al. 1989

Species of bacterium

Enterococcus raffinosus is a bacterial species of the Gram-positive genus Enterococcus, named for its facultative anaerobic metabolism, including the ability to ferment the trisaccharide raffinose. This mesophilic microaerophile has optimal growth at 37°C in Columbia Blood Medium (agar mixture of trypticase soy and brain heart infusion). It has an ovoid morphology categorized as coccal with arrangement singly, in pairs, or short chains.

According to analytical profile index results, this non-motile microbe is negative for urease and catalase but positive for Voges–Proskauer and pyrrolidonyl arylamidase. It hydrolyzes aesculin but not hippuric acid or starch. It lacks arginine deiminase, β-galactosidase, β-glucuronidase, and alkaline phosphatase.

Enterococcus raffinosus has been identified as a pathogen in Homo sapiens and Felis catus with vancomycin-resistant strains (VRE) involved in hospital-acquired infections that cause Crohn's disease. Additionally, this species uses Camelus dromedarius and Helix pomatia as hosts.

Sequencing of the CX012922 strain show genes divided between a 2.83 Mb circular genome for virulence factors like ATP-binding cassette (ABC) transporters and a 0.98 Mb circular megaplasmid for substrate utilization enzymes like raffinose permease.
