= Grimontia indica =

Scientific classification
- Domain: Bacteria
- Kingdom: Pseudomonadati
- Phylum: Pseudomonadota
- Class: Gammaproteobacteria
- Order: Vibrionales
- Family: Vibrionaceae
- Genus: Grimontia
- Species: G. indica

Binomial name
- Grimontia indica Singh et al. 2014

Type strain
- AK16

Species of bacterium

Grimontia indica is a Gram-negative, rod-shaped and facultative aerobic bacterium species from the genus of Grimontia which has been isolated from Seawater from the southeast coast of the Palk Bay.
