= Vancomycin-resistant Enterococcus =

Bacterial strains of Enterococcus that are resistant to the antibiotic vancomycin

- Other names: Vancomycin-resistant enterococci
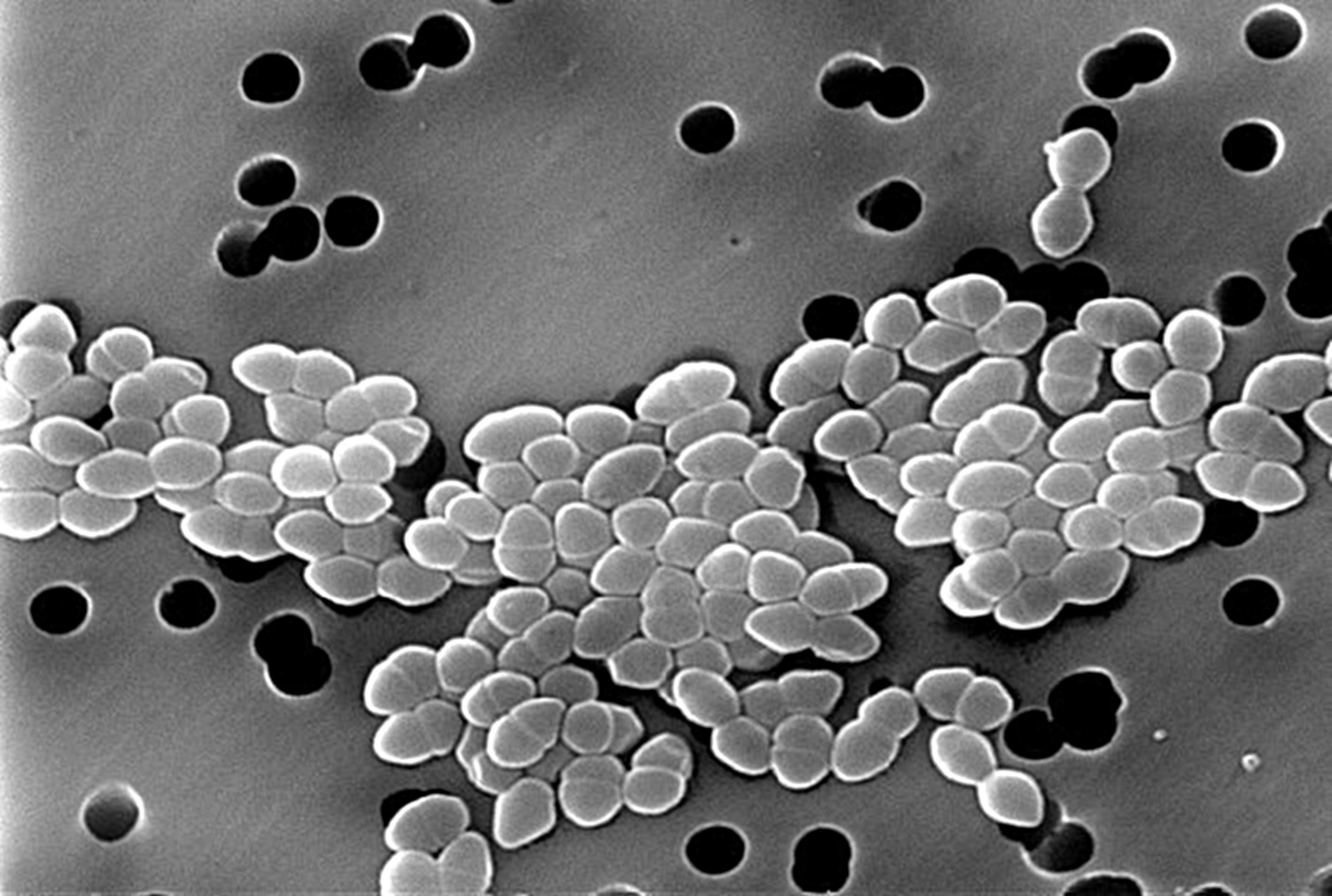
- SEM micrograph of vancomycin-resistant enterococci
- Specialty: Microbiology
- Prevention: Screen with peri-rectal swab
- Treatment: Linezolid

Vancomycin-resistant Enterococcus, or vancomycin-resistant enterococci (VRE), are bacterial strains of the genus Enterococcus that are resistant to the antibiotic vancomycin.

== Mechanism of acquired resistance ==
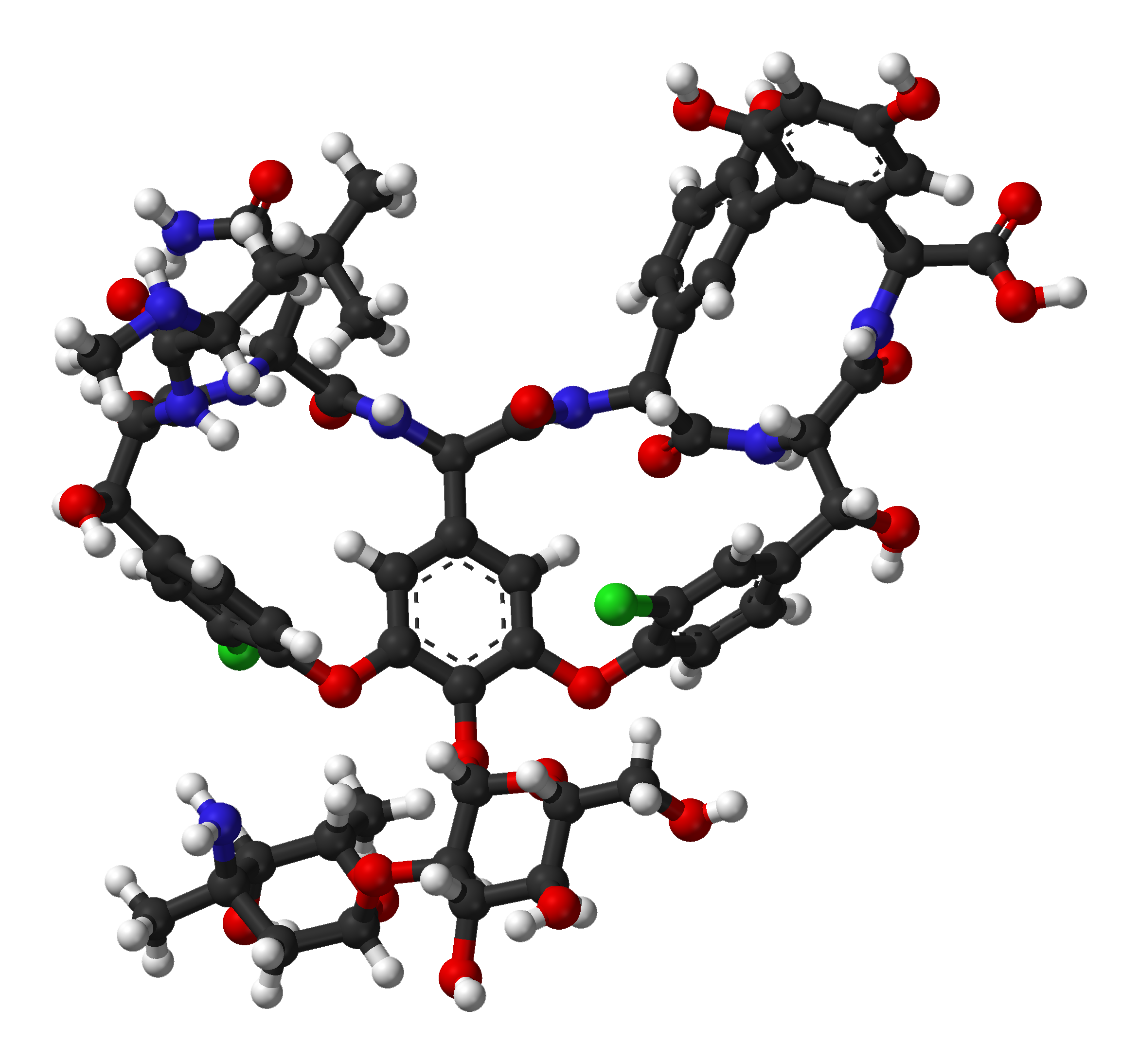
Vancomycin

Six different types of vancomycin resistance are shown by enterococcus: Van-A, Van-B, Van-C, Van-D, Van-E and Van-G. The significance is that Van-A VRE is resistant to both vancomycin and teicoplanin, Van-B VRE is resistant to vancomycin but susceptible to teicoplanin, and Van-C is only partly resistant to vancomycin.

The mechanism of resistance to vancomycin found in Enterococcus involves the alteration of the peptidoglycan synthesis pathway.

The D-alanyl-D-lactate variation results in the loss of one hydrogen-bonding interaction (four, as opposed to five for D-alanyl-D-alanine) being possible between vancomycin and the peptide. The D-alanyl-D-serine variation causes a six-fold loss of affinity between vancomycin and the peptide, likely due to steric hindrance.

To become vancomycin-resistant, vancomycin-sensitive enterococci typically obtain new DNA in the form of plasmids or transposons, which encode genes that confer vancomycin resistance. This acquired vancomycin resistance is distinguished from the natural vancomycin resistance of certain enterococcal species including E. gallinarum and E. casseliflavus/flavescens.

== Screening and diagnosis ==
Screening for VRE can be done in several ways. For inoculating peri-rectal/anal swabs or stool specimens directly, one method uses bile esculin azide agar plates containing 6 μg/ml of vancomycin. Black colonies should be identified as an enterococcus to species level and further confirmed as vancomycin resistant by an MIC method before reporting as VRE.

Vancomycin resistance can be determined for enterococcal colonies available in pure culture by inoculating a suspension of the organism onto a commercially available brain heart infusion agar (BHIA) plate containing 6 μg/ml vancomycin. The Clinical and Laboratory Standards Institute (CLSI) recommends performing a vancomycin MIC test and also motility and pigment production tests to distinguish species with acquired resistance (vanA and vanB) from those with vanC intrinsic resistance. Detection of vancomycin resistance by the use of PCR targeting vanA and vanB can also be performed.

Once the individual has VRE, it is important to ascertain which strain.

== Treatment of infection ==
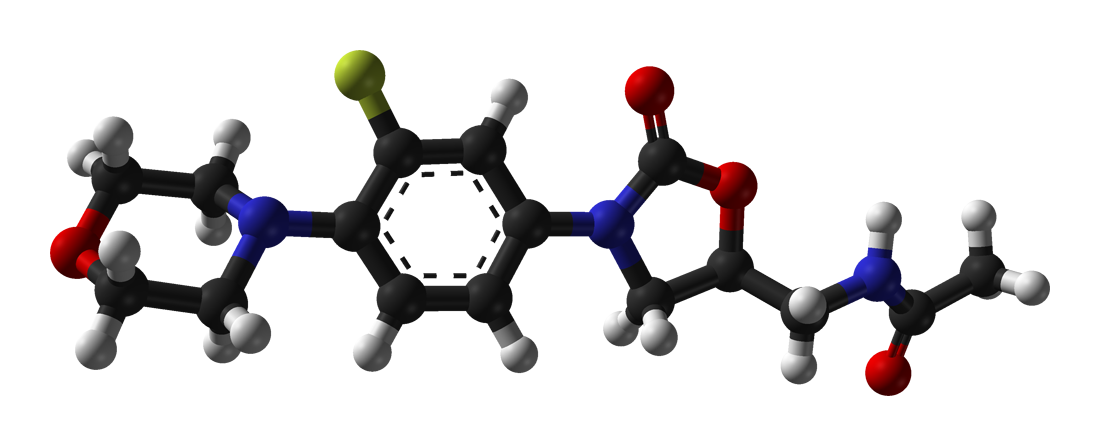
Linezolid

Ceftriaxone (a third-generation cephalosporin) use is a risk factor for VRE colonization and infection, and restriction of cephalosporin use has been associated with decreased VRE infection and transmission in hospitals.

Lactobacillus rhamnosus GG (LGG), a strain of L. rhamnosus, was used successfully for the first time to treat gastrointestinal carriage of VRE. In the US, linezolid is commonly used to treat VRE. The combination of linezolid and fosfomycin has been reported to show synergistic activity against VRE. Similar findings have been described for other oxazolidinones, suggesting a class effect that also includes newer agents such as contezolid, delpazolid, and sutezolid. The combination of daptomycin and ampicillin is another option to treat VRE infections, especially for bacteremia. For invasive vancomycin-resistant E. faecalis infections, both ampicillin-ceftriaxone and ampicillin-gentamicin combinations have been used successfully, with the latter specifically showing success in treating endocarditis. If the VRE strain is vanB, teicoplanin and dalbavancin are suitable therapeutic options. Another antibiotic often used as off-label salvage therapy in systemic VRE infections is oritavancin, a semisynthetic glycopeptide that has demonstrated synergic activity with fosfomycin.

With the emergence of resistance to last-resort antibiotics such as oxazolidinones (e.g., linezolid) and daptomycin, sustained research efforts are required to ensure the continuous development of treatment options. A 2025 review highlights relevant candidates in the current antibiotic development pipeline and discusses alternative strategies, including phage therapy and immunotherapeutics, for the treatment of multidrug-resistant enterococci.

== History ==
High-level vancomycin-resistant E. faecalis and E. faecium are clinical isolates first documented in Europe in 1986 and the United States in 1987. In the United States, vancomycin-resistant E. faecium was associated with 4% of healthcare-associated infections reported to the Centers for Disease Control and Prevention National Healthcare Safety Network from January 2006 to October 2007. VRE can be carried by healthy people who have come into contact with the bacteria, usually in a hospital (nosocomial infection), although it is thought that a significant percentage of intensively farmed chickens also carry VRE. Other regions have noted a similar distribution, but with increased incidence of VRE. For example, a 2006 study of nosocomial VRE revealed a rapid spread of resistance among enterococci along with an emerging shift in VRE distribution in the Middle East region, such as Iran. Treatment failures in enterococcal infections result from inadequate information regarding the glycopeptide resistance of endemic enterococci due to factors such as the presence of VanA and VanB. The study from Iran reported the first case of VRE isolates that carried the VanB gene in enterococcal strains from Iran. This study also noted the first documented isolation of nosocomial Enterococcus raffinosus and Enterococcus mundtii in the Middle East region.

== See also ==
- Vancomycin-resistant Staphylococcus aureus (VRSA)
- Antibiotic resistance
- Drug resistance
- MDR-TB
