= Grimontia =

Scientific classification
- Domain: Bacteria
- Kingdom: Pseudomonadati
- Phylum: Pseudomonadota
- Class: Gammaproteobacteria
- Order: Vibrionales
- Family: Vibrionaceae
- Genus: Grimontia; Thompson et al. 2003

Species
- G. celer G. hollisae G. indica G. marina G. sedimenti

Genus of bacteria

Grimontia is a genus of gram-negative bacteria from the family of Vibrionaceae.
