= Enterococcus malodoratus =

Scientific classification
- Domain: Bacteria
- Kingdom: Bacillati
- Phylum: Bacillota
- Class: Bacilli
- Order: Lactobacillales
- Family: Enterococcaceae
- Genus: Enterococcus
- Species: E. malodoratus

Binomial name
- Enterococcus malodoratus Collins et al. 1984

Species of bacterium

Enterococcus malodoratus is a species of the genus Enterococcus and a gram positive bacteria capable of opportunistic pathogenic response. These microbes have a thick polypeptide layer. Enterococcus can be found in the gastrointestinal tracts of humans and other mammals. In a study on the enterococcal flora of swine, E. malodoratus was found in the intestines and feces. It was not identified within the tonsils of swine, nor within cats, calves, dogs, horse, or poultry. The name "malodoratus" translates to "ill smelling".

== Physiology ==
Enterococcus malodoratus is a nonmotile, facultatively anaerobic microbe, as well as a chemoorganotroph with fermentative metabolism. The cells are coccoid in structure, found mostly in pairs or short streptococcus chains. Unlike many other Enterococcus species, E. malodoratus does not usually grow at 45 degrees Celsius, nor does it survive heating at 60 degrees Celsius for 30 minutes. It is nonpigmented. E. malodoratus does not produce methylcarbinol or hydrolyze arginine. In carbohydrate and raffinose broths, E. malodoratus forms acid. It does not form endospores thus separating it from bacilli and clostridia species.

== Pathology ==
The genus Enterococcus is "capable of inducing platelet aggregation and tissue factor-dependent fibrin production, which may be relevant to the pathogenesis of enterococcal endocarditis". The microbe is frequently the cause of hospital-acquired nosocomial infections, bloodstream infections, and urinary tract infections in its host. Though a normal part of the biota of the intestinal tract of humans and other mammals, Enterococci can also survive for lengths of time with adhesion to environmental surfaces; thus contributing to transmission and possible contagion between hosts. The genus has also been proven to survive desiccation. In general, the inhospitable, acidic, and competitive environment of the gastrointestinal tract limits the spread of enterococci. However, it is often during the early stages of a medical intervention that the enterococci can successfully move and colonize beyond the neutral area near the colon.

== Diagnosis/identification ==
DNA methods have been used by researchers to correctly identify specific species within the genus Enterococcus. Using the chaperonin 60 gene (Cpn60), specific species of DNA sequencing can be distinguished in the ~600-bp region. It is imperative to correctly distinguish between Enterococcus species, as some species have been found to be resistant to some drug therapies. In fact, the genus Enterococcus has become important in the study of super infections and pathogenic resistance to antibiotics. E. malodoratus, specifically, has not yet been found to have developed that resistance.

== Historical ==
Until 1984, all Enterococcus species were considered part of the genus Streptococcus. It was during the 1980s that studies on fatty acid composition, nucleic acid hybridization, and comparative oligonucleotide cataloguing of 16S rRNA showed the significant differences between enterococci and streptococci. The differences were enough to establish Enterococcus as a genus of its own. Each species within the enterococci category was reclassified, including E. malodoratus – originally known as S. faecalis subsp. malodoratus.
