= Enterococcus durans =

Scientific classification
- Domain: Bacteria
- Kingdom: Bacillati
- Phylum: Bacillota
- Class: Bacilli
- Order: Lactobacillales
- Family: Enterococcaceae
- Genus: Enterococcus
- Species: E. durans

Binomial name
- Enterococcus durans (ex Sherman and Wing, 1937) Collins et al., 1984

Species of bacterium

Enterococcus durans is a species of Enterococcus. It is a gram-positive, catalase- and oxidase-negative, coccus bacterium. The organism is also a facultative anaerobic organism. Prior to 1984, it was known as Streptococcus durans.

Certain strains have also been identified as producers of anti-inflammatory agents, which are being studied in medical research. E. durans is less commonly isolated in clinical infections than E. faecalis and E. faecium, but it has been increasingly recognized in hospital settings, particularly in patients with urinary catheters and prolonged antibiotic exposure.

== Metabolism ==
In terms of metabolism, E. durans primarily shares its substrate utilization profile with E. faecium. It can metabolize L-arabinose (weakly), melibiose and lactose which aids in its biochemical distinction from E. faecalis. E. durans is often misidentified in clinical diagnostics due to phenotypic overlap with E. faecium, especially when relying on MALDI-TOF mass spectrometry. Whole-genome sequencing are increasingly recommended for accurate identification and characterization.

== Pathogenesis ==
Enterococcus durans is an infrequent cause of infections in humans. Several cases of E. durans endocarditis have been reported in patients with valve replacements. One case of bacterial endocarditis in a patient with an implantable cardioverter-defibrillator (ICD) has also been reported.
