= Enterococcus mundtii =

Scientific classification
- Domain: Bacteria
- Kingdom: Bacillati
- Phylum: Bacillota
- Class: Bacilli
- Order: Lactobacillales
- Family: Enterococcaceae
- Genus: Enterococcus
- Species: E. mundtii

Binomial name
- Enterococcus mundtii Collins et al. 1986

Species of bacterium

Enterococcus mundtii is a species of Enterococcus. Its genome has been sequenced. The type strain is NCDO 2375.

On the human body, Enterococcus mundtii can be commonly found in the navel.
