= Grimontia hollisae =

Scientific classification
- Domain: Bacteria
- Kingdom: Pseudomonadati
- Phylum: Pseudomonadota
- Class: Gammaproteobacteria
- Order: Vibrionales
- Family: Vibrionaceae
- Genus: Grimontia
- Species: G. hollisae

Binomial name
- Grimontia hollisae (Hickman et al. 1982) Thompson et al. 2003

Type strain
- NCTC 1164

Species of bacterium

Grimontia hollisae is a species of Grimontia proteobacteria (family Vibrionaceae) found naturally in marine environments. Based on phylogenetic evidence, the species was reclassified in 2003 from Vibrio hollisae.

G. hollisae is primarily associated with gastroenteritis, causing a moderate to severe diarrhea. Most recorded cases of infection occurred after the consumption of seafood, namely as oysters. Cases of bacteremia due to G. hollisae have been reported.
