= Enterococcus moraviensis =

Scientific classification
- Domain: Bacteria
- Kingdom: Bacillati
- Phylum: Bacillota
- Class: Bacilli
- Order: Lactobacillales
- Family: Enterococcaceae
- Genus: Enterococcus
- Species: E. moraviensis

Binomial name
- Enterococcus moraviensis Švec et al. 2001

Species of bacterium

Enterococcus moraviensis is a species of Enterococcus with type strain CCM 4856^{T} (= LMG 19486^{T}).
