= Pseudomonas moraviensis =

Scientific classification
- Domain: Bacteria
- Kingdom: Pseudomonadati
- Phylum: Pseudomonadota
- Class: Gammaproteobacteria
- Order: Pseudomonadales
- Family: Pseudomonadaceae
- Genus: Pseudomonas
- Species: P. moraviensis

Binomial name
- Pseudomonas moraviensis Tvrzová, et al. 2006

Species of bacterium

Pseudomonas moraviensis is a Gram-negative soil bacterium. It is named after Moravia, the region of the Czech Republic where it was first isolated. The type strain is CCM 7280T.
