= One Health Model =

Multiple health practices working together

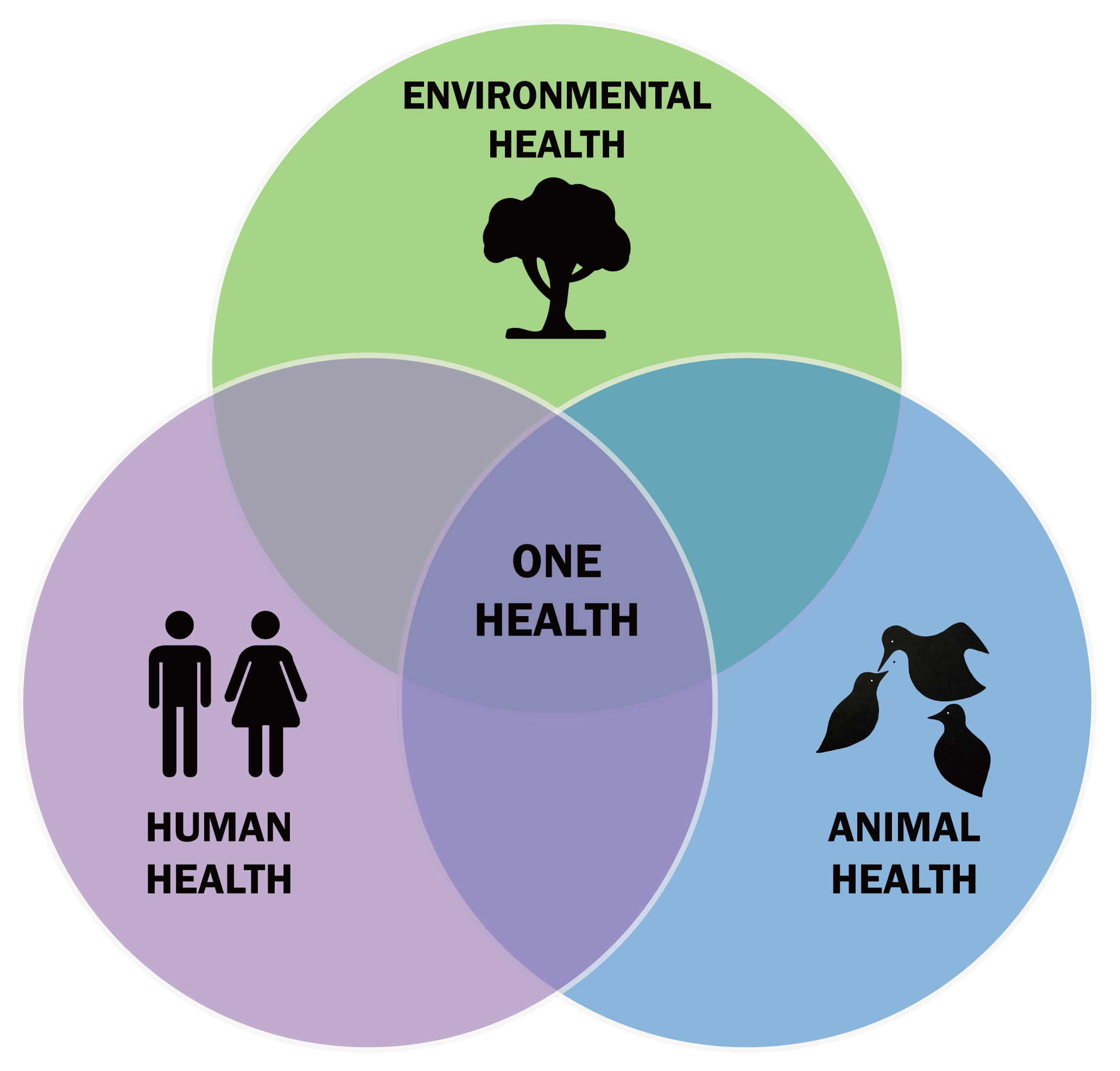
Graphic representation of the One Health Concept

In 2017, the U.S. Government defined one health as "a collaborative, multi-sectoral, and transdisciplinary approach --- working at the local, regional, national, and global levels -- with the goal of achieving optimal health outcomes recognizing the interconnection between people, animals, plants, and their shared environment" (CDC, 2025). The concept of One Health is the unity of multiple practices that work together locally, nationally, and globally to help achieve optimal health for people, animals, and the environment. When the people, animals, and environment are put together, they make up the One Health Triad . The One Health Triad shows how the health of people, animals, and the environment is linked to one another. Each element affects and is affected by the others. For instance, diseases transmitted from animals can impact human health, while environmental factors like pollution or climate change can influence both animal and human health. With One Health being a worldwide concept, it makes it easier to advance health care in the 21st century. When this concept is used, and applied properly, it can help protect people, animals, and the environment in the present and future generations.

== Background ==
The origins of the One Health Model dates as far back as 1821, with the first links between human and animal diseases being recognized by Rudolf Virchow. Virchow noticed links between human and animal disease, coining the term "zoonosis." The major connection Virchow made was between Trichinella spiralis in swine and human infections. It was over a century later before the ideas laid out by Virchow were integrated into a single health model connecting human health with animal health.

In 1964, Calvin Schwabe, a former member of World Health Organization (WHO) and the founding chair of Department of Epidemiology and Preventive Medicine at the Veterinary School at the University of California Davis, called for a "One Medicine" model emphasizing the need for collaboration between human and wildlife pathologists as a means of controlling and even preventing disease spread. This model sought to bridge the gap between human health and animal health, advocating for a more integrated approach to preventing and controlling diseases that impact both humans and animals." It would be another four decades before the One Health became a reality with the 12 Manhattan Principles, where human and animal pathologists called for "One Health, One World." This was coined by the Wildlife Conversation Society in 2004 where a symposium was held with experts and organization at Rockefeller University.

The One Health Model has gained momentum in recent years due to the discovery of the multiple interconnections that exist between animal and human disease. Recent estimates place zoonotic diseases as the source 60% of total human pathogens, and 75% of emerging human pathogens.

Greater awareness of food safety concerns has also prompted further support of the One Health Model. More than 60 percent of pathogens globally originate from the environment. In Canada over 10 million illnesses per year are food-borne. This is expected to have an economic impact on the country, costing $3.7 billion yearly. These illnesses highlight the need for a 'One Health' approach that addresses public health concerns and reduces the economic costs associated with disease outbreaks. The One Health Model can significantly minimize these costs and improve health outcomes by promoting early intervention and collaboration across sectors.The One Health Model has been introduced as a method to encourage intervention as early as possible, which has previously been overlooked but remains impactful to many economies.

In the more recent years, the One Health Model has been applied to the COVID-19 global pandemic. The COVID 19 global pandemic consisted of human, animal, and environmental influences and transmission pathways. This exacerbated the value of the One Health model as multiple sector in medical, environmental health, public health, physicians, veterinarians, and researchers were challenged to work together to improve public health outcome.

== Applying the One Health Model ==
The One Health Model can constantly be applied with human and animal interactions. One of the main situations where One Health can be applied is with canine and feline obesity being linked to their owners and their own obesity. Obesity in canines and felines is not good for them nor is it good for humans. The obesity of humans and their animals can result in many health problems such as diabetes mellitus, osteoarthritis, and many others. The only solution for this issue is to encourage owners to have a healthy lifestyle for both them and their animals. Zoonotic Diseases is another situation that the One Health model can be applied to. This is talked about more in the Zoonotic Disease section.

Category	Human Health	Pet Health (Canine and Feline)	Shared Risks and Solutions
Obesity	Risk of diabetes, osteoarthritis, heart disease; -Decreased life expectancy	Risk of diabetes, osteoarthritis, limited mobility; -Decreased quality of life	Both may suffer from obesity-related diseases; Shared behaviors: Overfeeding, lack of exercise
Zoonotic Disease	Risk of disease transmission from pets (e.g., parasites, bacteria)	Risk of disease transmission to humans (e.g., parasites, bacteria)	Both can contract and spread diseases to each other
Solution	Promote healthier lifestyle choices (diet, exercise)	Promote exercise, proper diet, regular vet check-ups	Encourage mutual health: Joint activities, healthier diets

== One Health and Antibiotic Resistance ==
Antibiotic resistance is becoming a serious problem in today's agriculture industry and for humans. One reason for this occurring resistance is that natural resistomes are present in different environmental niches. These environmental resistomes function as an antibiotic resistance gene. There are many questions and research that needs to be further done to find out if these environmental resistomes play a big role in the antibiotic resistance that is occurring in humans, animals, and plants. From One Health perspective, the environment is increasingly recognized as a key reservoir for antimicrobial resistance, linking agriculture practices, wildlife exposure, and human health outcomes. A recent study was done and reported that 700 000 annual deaths were caused by infections due to drug resistant pathogens This study also reported that if unchecked, this number will increase to 10 million by 2050. The National Antimicrobial Monitoring System is a system used to monitor antimicrobial resistance among bacteria that is isolated from animals that are used as food

In 2013, they found that about 29% of turkeys, 18% of swine, 17% of beef, and 9% of chicken were multi drug resistant, meaning they had resistance to 3 or more classes of antimicrobials. Having this resistance for both animals and humans makes it easier for zoonotic diseases to be transferred between them and also makes it easier for the resistance of these antimicrobials to be passed on. With this being said, there are many possible risk management options that can be taken to help reduce this possibility. Most of these risk management options can take place on the farm or at the slaughter house for animals. When it comes to humans, risk management is left to personal responsibility, in relation to hygiene, up to date vaccinations, and proper use of antibiotics. With that being said, the same management on farms needs to be taken for proper use of antibiotics and only using them when it is absolutely necessary and improving the general hygiene in all stages of production. With these management factors added in with research and knowledge on the amount of resistance within our environment, antimicrobial resistance may be able to be controlled and help reduce the amount of zoonotic diseases that are passed between animals and humans.

== Zoonotic Diseases and One Health ==
Zoonosis or zoonotic disease can be defined as an infectious disease that can be transmitted between animals and humans. One Health plays a big role in helping to prevent and control zoonotic diseases. Approximately 75% of new and emerging infectious diseases in humans are defined as zoonotic. Zoonotic diseases can be spread in many different ways. The most common known ways they are spread are through direct contact, indirect contact, vector-borne, and food-borne. Below in (Table 1) you can see a list of different zoonotic diseases, their main reservoirs, and their mode of transmission.

Table 1: Zoonotic Diseases

Disease	Main reservoirs	Usual mode of transmission to humans
Anthrax	livestock, wild animals, environment	direct contact, ingestion
Animal influenza	livestock, humans	may be reverse zoonosis
Avian influenza	poultry, ducks	direct contact
Bovine tuberculosis	cattle	milk
Brucellosis	cattle, goats, sheep, pigs	dairy products, milk
Cat scratch fever	cats	bite, scratch
Coronavirus (MERS)	dromedary, camels	direct and indirect contact
Cysticercosis	cattle, pigs	meat
Cryptosporidiosis	cattle, sheep, pets	water, direct contact
Enzootic abortion	farm animals, sheep	direct contact, aerosol
Erysipeloid	pigs, fish, environment	direct contact
Fish tank granuloma	fish	direct contact, water
Campylobacteriosis	poultry, farm animals	raw meat, milk
Salmonellosis	poultry, cattle, sheep, pigs	foodborne
Giardiasis	humans, wildlife	waterborne, person to person
Glanders	horse, donkey, mule	direct contact
Haemorrhagic colitis	ruminants	direct contact (and foodborne)
Hantavirus syndromes	rodents	aerosol
Hepatitis E	not yet known	not yet known
Hydatid disease	dogs, sheep	ingestion of eggs excreted by dog
Leptospirosis	rodents, ruminants	infected urine, water
Listeriosis	cattle, sheep, soil	dairy produce, meat products
Louping ill	sheep, grouse	direct contact, tick bite
Lyme disease	ticks, rodents, sheep, deer, small mammals	tick bite
Lymphocytic choriomeningitis	rodents	direct contact
Orf	sheep	direct contact
Pasteurellosis	dogs, cats, many mammals	bite/scratch, direct contact
Plague	rats and their fleas	flea bite
Psittacosis	birds, poultry, ducks	aerosol, direct contact
Q fever	cattle, sheep, goats, cats	aerosol, direct contact, milk, fomites
Rabies	dogs, foxes, bats, cats animal	bite
Rat bite fever (Haverhill fever)	rats	bite/scratch, milk, water
Rift Valley fever	cattle, goats, sheep	direct contact, mosquito bite
Ringworm	cats, dogs, cattle, many animal species	direct contact
Streptococcal sepsis	pigs	direct contact, meat
Streptococcal sepsis	horses, cattle	direct contact, milk
Tick-borne encephalitis	rodents, small mammals, livestock	tickbite, unpasteurised milk products
Toxocariasis	dogs, cats	direct contact
Toxoplasmosis	cats, ruminants	ingestion of faecal oocysts, meat
Trichinellosis	pigs, wild boar	pork products
Tularemia	rabbits, wild animals, environment, ticks	direct contact, aerosol, ticks, inoculation
Ebola, Crimean–Congo HF, Lassa fever, and Marburg virus disease	variously: rodents, ticks, livestock, primates, bats	direct contact, inoculation, tick bite
West Nile fever	wild birds, mosquitoes	mosquito bite
Zoonotic diphtheria	cattle, farm animals, dogs	direct contact, milk
Nipah Virus	fruit bats, humans	contaminated food, infected animals, infected individuals

== Environmental Stressors and Mental Health in the One Health Model ==
The One Health Model traditionally focuses on zoonotic diseases and antimicrobial resistance, but increasing attention is being given to the intersections of environmental stressors and mental health in both humans and animals. Environmental stressors refer to factors such as climate change, pollution, habitat destruction, and biodiversity loss that can negatively impact the physical and psychological health of both humans and animals face these stressors, which impact the ecosystem as a whole. Psychological challenges exist, like eco-anxiety, depression, and post-traumatic stress disorder (PTSD) in response to environmental changes or natural disasters.

== Climate Change and Mental Health ==
The direct effects of climate change includes acute extreme weather events such as wildfires, storms, and flooding as well as chronic stressors such as heat and drought. Indirect effects of climate change include immigration, emigration, food insecurity, housing insecurity, and lack of access and availability of health care resources. Climate change has been linked to increased psychological distress, particularly among communities experiencing extreme weather events such as hurricanes, wildfires, and prolonged droughts. Studies have shown that rising temperatures correlate with higher suicide rates, increased aggression, and worsening symptoms of psychiatric disorders. In 2023, a study revealed extreme weather events cause traumatic experiences that further increase the risk of anxiety and Post traumatic stress disorder. The study also revealed that heat increased the mortality and morbidity to mental illness significantly (Walinski, Annika., et al, 2023) In animals, climate-induced stress disrupts behavior, migration patterns, and reproductive health, which can lead to ecosystem imbalances affecting both wildlife and human populations. Vulnerable groups include those previously diagnosed with a mental illness, children, adolescents, and the elderly (Walinski, Annika., et al, 2023). These human, animal and environmental effects highlight the relevance of integrated health frameworks, such as the One Health approach, in addressing, the mental health and ecological consequences of climate change. The One Health approach can be utilized to evaluate and determine potential interventions, policies, and procedures in or to mitigate the effects of climate change on mental health.

== Pollution and Neurodevelopmental Disorders ==
Air pollution, particularly fine particulate matter (PM2.5), has been associated with cognitive decline, neuroinflammation, and higher risks of anxiety and depression in humans. Research also suggests that exposure to heavy metals and pesticides affects neurological health in livestock and wildlife, potentially altering animal behavior in ways that impact human-animal interactions, food supply, and disease transmission.

== Deforestation and Emerging Zoonotic Threats ==
Deforestation shrinks landscapes as they are cleared for timber and land development. As a result, wildlife is forced to share the environment and resources making stressful situations. This has a poor impact on the overall health of animals, causing them to transmit diseases throughout the ecosystem. The destruction of natural habitats contributes to the displacement of wildlife, increasing the likelihood of human-wildlife conflict and the emergence of new zoonotic diseases. Psychological stress among affected human populations, particularly Indigenous communities, is compounded by the loss of biodiversity and traditional ways of life.

Habitat destruction, particularly habitat fragmentation breaks habitats into smaller and isolated patches. This leads to wildlife displacement, raising the chances of human-animal interactions. Consequently, this can cause zoonotic diseases, which are illnesses that transfer from animals to humans. This scenario illustrates the interconnectedness of animal health, human health, and environmental health as outlined in the One Health model.

== The Role of One Health in Addressing Environmental Mental Health Challenges ==
Integrating mental health considerations into the One Health framework can improve public health preparedness and resilience. Solutions include:

Urban planning to reduce heat-related mental distress and improve access to green spaces. Wildlife conservation efforts that promote ecological stability and reduce human-animal conflict. Interdisciplinary research combining epidemiology, psychology, and environmental science to study the long-term mental health effects of climate change. By expanding One Health beyond infectious disease control to include environmental determinants of mental health, global health systems can develop more holistic and sustainable solutions.

== See also ==
- Antibiotic resistance
- Epidemiology
- Exposome
