= Frateuria aurantia =

Scientific classification
- Domain: Bacteria
- Kingdom: Pseudomonadati
- Phylum: Pseudomonadota
- Class: Gammaproteobacteria
- Order: Lysobacterales
- Family: Rhodanobacteraceae
- Genus: Frateuria
- Species: F. aurantia

Binomial name
- Frateuria aurantia (ex Kondô and Ameyama, 1958) Swings et al., 1980

Species of bacterium

Frateuria aurantia is a species of bacterium. It is named after the Belgian microbiologist Joseph Frateur. The cells are mostly straight rods. Frateuria aurantia was isolated from the plant Lilium auratum and from the fruit of the raspberry Rubus parvifolius. It is a potassium solubilizing bacteria. In certain plants like tobacco, Frateuria aurantia could increase crop yield without using so much chemical fertilizer in soil that is nutrient deficient. In this type of soil the bacteria helped tobacco in absorbing potassium, causing an 39% increase of potassium found in the leaf. This increase in the nutrient allows for more plant growth and yield.
