= Enterococcus casseliflavus =

Scientific classification
- Domain: Bacteria
- Kingdom: Bacillati
- Phylum: Bacillota
- Class: Bacilli
- Order: Lactobacillales
- Family: Enterococcaceae
- Genus: Enterococcus
- Species: E. casseliflavus

Binomial name
- Enterococcus casseliflavus Collins et al. 1984

Synonyms
- Enterococcus flavescens; Streptococcus casseliflavus

Species of bacterium

Enterococcus casseliflavus is a species of commensal gram-positive bacteria. Its name derived from the "flavus" the Latin word for yellow due to the bright yellow pigment that it produces. This organism can be found in the gastrointestinal tract of humans.

The most common form of E. casseliflavus infection is bacteremia. A study evaluating cases of E. casseliflavus bacteremia found that malignancy and diabetes mellitus were the most common complications, suggesting that a compromised immune system may be a risk factor for developing E. casseliflavus bacteremia. Several cases of bacteremia have been attributed to prior infection or surgery on the biliary tract and liver, suggesting that E. casseliflavus has a high affiliation for these organs.

== Description ==
Enterococcus casseliflavus are facultative Gram-positive cocci. They are catalase negative and produce pyrolidonyl arylamidase. They are able to produce acid from many sugars, including L-Arabinose, gluconate, inulin, mannitol, melibiose, trehatol, and xylitol. Similar to other members of the genus, E. casseliflavus is able to hydrolyze esculin. This organism reacts with Lancefield group D antisera.

E. casseliflavus shares many phenotypic traits with the more frequently encountered E. faecium. However, additional biochemical tests can be used to separate the two organisms. Additionally, E. casseliflavus produces respiratory quinones and its colonies possess a bright yellow pigment.

E. casseliflavus possess the vanC genotype and are intrinsically resistant to glycopeptides such as vancomycin.
