= Enterococcus pseudoavium =

Scientific classification
- Domain: Bacteria
- Kingdom: Bacillati
- Phylum: Bacillota
- Class: Bacilli
- Order: Lactobacillales
- Family: Enterococcaceae
- Genus: Enterococcus
- Species: E. pseudoavium

Binomial name
- Enterococcus pseudoavium Collins et al. 1989

Species of bacterium

Enterococcus pseudoavium is a species Gram-positive bacteria from the genus Enterococcus.
