= Brain heart infusion =

Growth medium for microorganisms

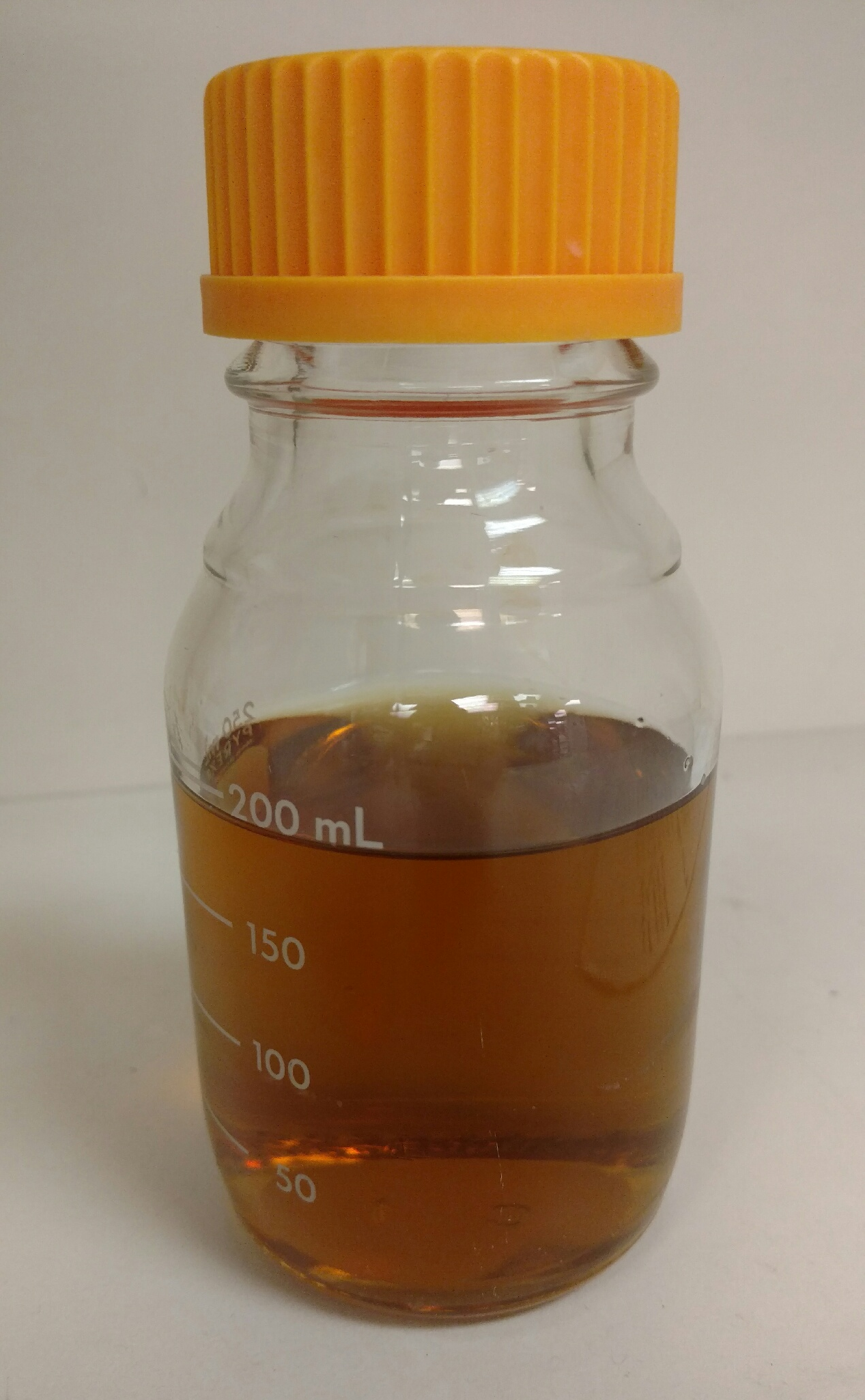
Brain heart infusion media made from Difco powdered media

Brain heart infusion (BHI) is a growth medium for growing microorganisms. It is a nutrient-rich medium, and can therefore be used to culture a variety of fastidious organisms. In particular, it has been used to culture streptococci, pneumococci and meningococci, which can be otherwise challenging to grow. BHI is made by combining an infusion from boiled bovine or porcine heart and brain with a variety of other nutrients. BHI broth is often used in food safety, water safety, and antibiotic sensitivity tests.

== Uses ==
BHI is broadly used for culturing a variety of microorganisms, both in clinical and research settings. A number of fastidious organisms, including some bacteria, yeasts, and other fungi, grow well on BHI. BHI with 6.5% sodium chloride can be used to differentiate between enterococci and group D streptococci.

== History ==
The earliest version of brain heart infusion media was made in 1899 when Edward Rosenow combined dextrose broth with calf brain tissue to grow streptococci. This was modified in 1923 by Russell Haden while working on dental pathogens. Modern BHI typically uses an infusion from porcine brains and hearts rather than calf brain tissue, and uses disodium phosphate as a buffer, rather than the calcium carbonate used by Rosenow and Haden.

== Components ==
BHI typically contains infusion of beef or pig heart as well as calf brain, a source of amino acids (often either digested gelatin or other animal tissue), salt, disodium phosphate as a buffer, and glucose as a source of sugar. Many formulations for BHI agar also exist, in which agar is added as a gelling agent for growing plates of microorganisms.

== See also ==
- Lysogeny broth
