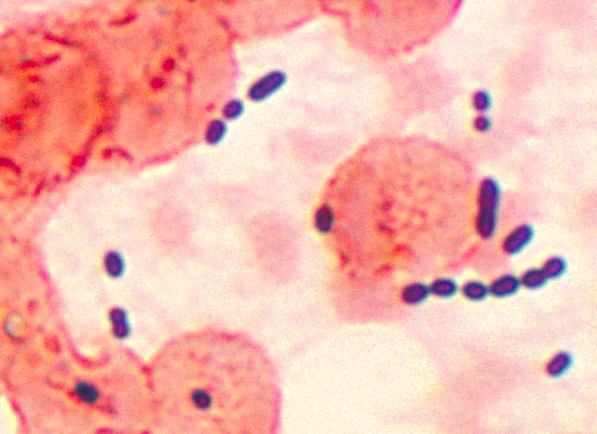
- Enterococcus sp. infection in pulmonary tissue

Scientific classification
- Domain: Bacteria
- Kingdom: Bacillati
- Phylum: Bacillota
- Class: Bacilli
- Order: Lactobacillales
- Family: Enterococcaceae
- Genus: Enterococcus (ex Thiercelin & Jouhaud 1903); Schleifer & Kilpper-Bälz 1984

Species
- E. alcedinis; E. aquimarinus; E. asini; E. avium; E. bulliens; E. burkinafasonensis; E. caccae; E. camelliae; E. canintestini; E. canis; E. casseliflavus; E. cecorum; E. columbae; E. crotali; E. devriesei; E. diestrammenae; E. dispar; E. durans; E. eurekensis; E. faecalis; E. faecium; E. gallinarum; E. gilvus; E. haemoperoxidus; E. hermanniensis; E. hirae; E. hulanensis; E. innesii; E. italicus; E. lactis; E. lemanii; E. malodoratus; E. massiliensis; E. mediterraneensis; E. moraviensis; E. mundtii; E. olivae; E. pallens; E. phoeniculicola; E. plantarum; E. pseudoavium; E. quebecensis; E. raffinosus; E. ratti; E. rivorum; E. rotai; E. saccharolyticus; E. saigonensis; E. silesiacus; E. sulfureus; E. solitarius; E. songbeiensis; E. termitis; E. thailandicus; E. ureasiticus; E. ureilyticus; E. viikkiensis; E. villorum; E. wangshanyuanii; E. xiangfangensis; E. xinjiangensis

= Enterococcus =

Genus of bacteria

Enterococcus is a large genus of lactic acid bacteria of the phylum Bacillota. Enterococci are Gram-positive cocci that often occur in pairs (diplococci) or short chains, and are difficult to distinguish from streptococci on physical characteristics alone. Two species are common commensal organisms in the intestines of humans: E. faecalis (90–95%) and E. faecium (5–10%). Rare clusters of infections occur with other species, including E. durans, E. casseliflavus, E. gallinarum, and E. raffinosus.

== Physiology and classification ==
Enterococci are facultative anaerobic organisms, i.e., they are capable of cellular respiration in both oxygen-rich and oxygen-poor environments. Though they are not capable of forming spores, enterococci are tolerant of a wide range of environmental conditions: extreme temperature (10–45 °C), pH (4.6–9.9), and high sodium chloride concentrations.

E. faecium and E. faecalis can be differentiated based on their carbohydrate metabolism: E. faecium consistently metabolizes lactose but not melezitose or inositol, whereas E. faecalis reliably metabolizes sorbitol and sucrose but lacks the ability to utilize L-arabinose, melibiose, or raffinose. Less is known of other species; E. durans share most of the important carbohydrate metabolism with E. faecium.

Enterococci exhibit variable hemolysis on blood agar. Differences occur between species, and between strains of species. More virulent organisms are more likely to exhibit alpha (partial) or beta (complete) hemolysis than less virulent specimens of Enterococcus, which frequently exhibit gamma (absent) hemolysis.

=== History ===
Members of the genus Enterococcus (from Greek έντερο, éntero 'intestine' and κοκκος, coccos 'granule') were classified as group D Streptococcus until 1984, when genomic DNA analysis indicated a separate genus classification would be appropriate.

== Evolution ==
This genus appears to have evolved 425 million years ago to 500 million years ago.

== Pathology ==
Important clinical infections caused by Enterococcus include urinary tract infections (see Enterococcus faecalis), bacteremia, bacterial endocarditis, diverticulitis, meningitis, and spontaneous bacterial peritonitis. Sensitive strains of these bacteria can be treated with ampicillin, penicillin and vancomycin. In catheterized patients receiving intensive care, Enterococcus spp., have been reported the dominant cause of urinary tract infections, particularly in patients treated with cephalosporin antibiotics. Recent work has shown that multiple genetically distinct Enterococcus sequence types, including antibiotic resistant and high risk clones, can coexist in the same urine sample from a single ICU patient, with the more virulent lineage often present only as a minority subpopulation - undetectable by standard diagnostics. Urinary tract infections can be treated specifically with nitrofurantoin, even in cases of vancomycin resistance.

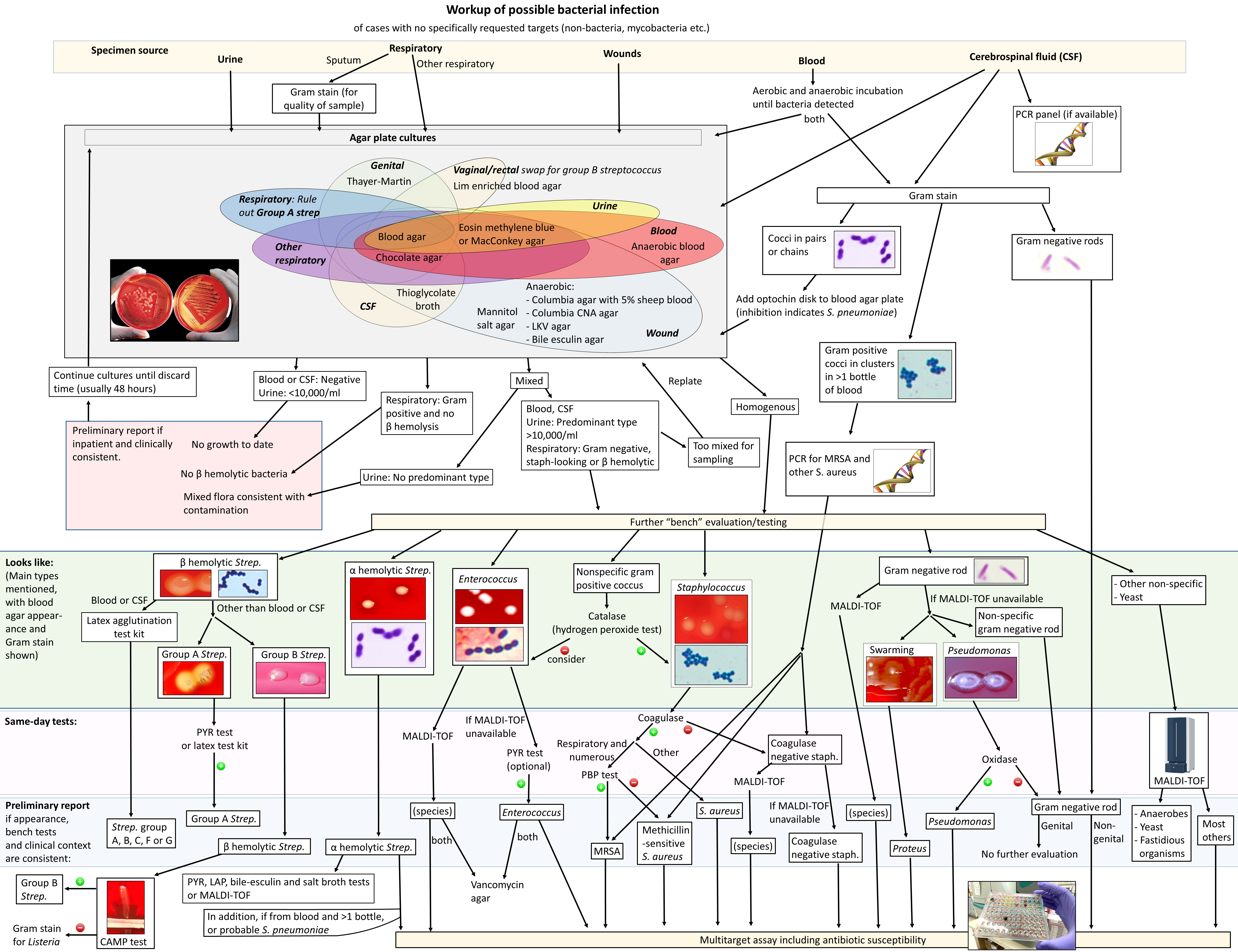
Example of a workup algorithm of possible bacterial infection in cases with no specifically requested targets (non-bacteria, mycobacteria etc.), with most common situations and agents seen in a New England community hospital setting. Enterococcus is included near bottom-center.

=== Meningitis ===
Enterococcal meningitis is a rare complication of neurosurgery. It is often treated with intravenous or intrathecal vancomycin, yet it is debatable as to whether its use has any impact on outcome. The removal of any neurological devices is a crucial part of the management of these infections. New epidemiological evidence has shown that enterococci are major infectious agent in chronic bacterial prostatitis. Enterococci are able to form biofilm in the prostate gland, making their eradication difficult. Cases of enterococcal meningitis, in the absence of trauma or surgery, should raise suspicion of an underlying intestinal pathology (e.g., strongyloidiasis).

=== Bloodstream infections ===
Enterococcus species are frequent causes of hospital-acquired bloodstream infections (BSIs). They ranked as the second most common cause of ICU-acquired BSIs in Europe in 2019. Enterococcal BSIs have high mortality rates, typically around 20–30%. Outcomes tend to be worse for E. faecium infections, which often exhibit higher antibiotic resistance (e.g. high rates of vancomycin resistance). The incidence of vancomycin-resistant Enterococcus infections has been rising globally. In a 2014–2021 cohort study of 584 patients with enterococcal BSI, the 30-day mortality was 27.5%. Mortality was significantly higher when the infection was caused by vancomycin-resistant E. faecium (36.6%) or vancomycin-susceptible E. faecium (31.8%) than when caused by E. faecalis (23.2%). Enterococcal bacteremia can also lead to infective endocarditis.

== Antibacterial resistance ==
From a medical standpoint, an important feature of this genus is the high level of intrinsic antibiotic resistance. Some enterococci are intrinsically resistant to β-lactam-based antibiotics (penicillins, cephalosporins, carbapenems), as well as many aminoglycosides. In the last two decades, particularly virulent strains of Enterococcus that are resistant to vancomycin (vancomycin-resistant Enterococcus, or VRE) have emerged in nosocomial infections of hospitalized patients, especially in the US. Other developed countries, such as the UK, have been spared this epidemic, and, in 2005, Singapore managed to halt an epidemic of VRE. Although quinupristin/dalfopristin (Synercid) was previously indicated for treatment of VRE in the USA, the FDA approval for this indication has since been retracted. The rationale for the retraction of Synercid's indication for VRE was based upon poor efficacy in E. faecalis, which is implicated in the vast majority of VRE cases. Tigecycline has also been shown to have antienterococcal activity, as has rifampicin. However, resistance to these last-resort antibiotics, including linezolid and daptomycin, is increasingly being reported, involving complex genetic mechanisms that pose new challenges for treatment.

Bacillus haynesii CD223 and Advenella mimigardefordensis SM421 can inhibit the growth of Enterococcus spp.

== Water quality ==
In bodies of water, the acceptable level of contamination is very low; for example in the state of Hawaii, and most of the United States, the limit for water off its beaches is a five-week geometric mean of 35 colony-forming units per 100 ml of water, above which the state may post warnings to stay out of the ocean. In 2004, measurement of enterococci took the place of fecal coliforms as the new American federal standard for water quality at public saltwater beaches and alongside Escherichia coli at freshwater beaches. It is believed to provide a higher correlation than fecal coliform with many of the human pathogens often found in city sewage.
