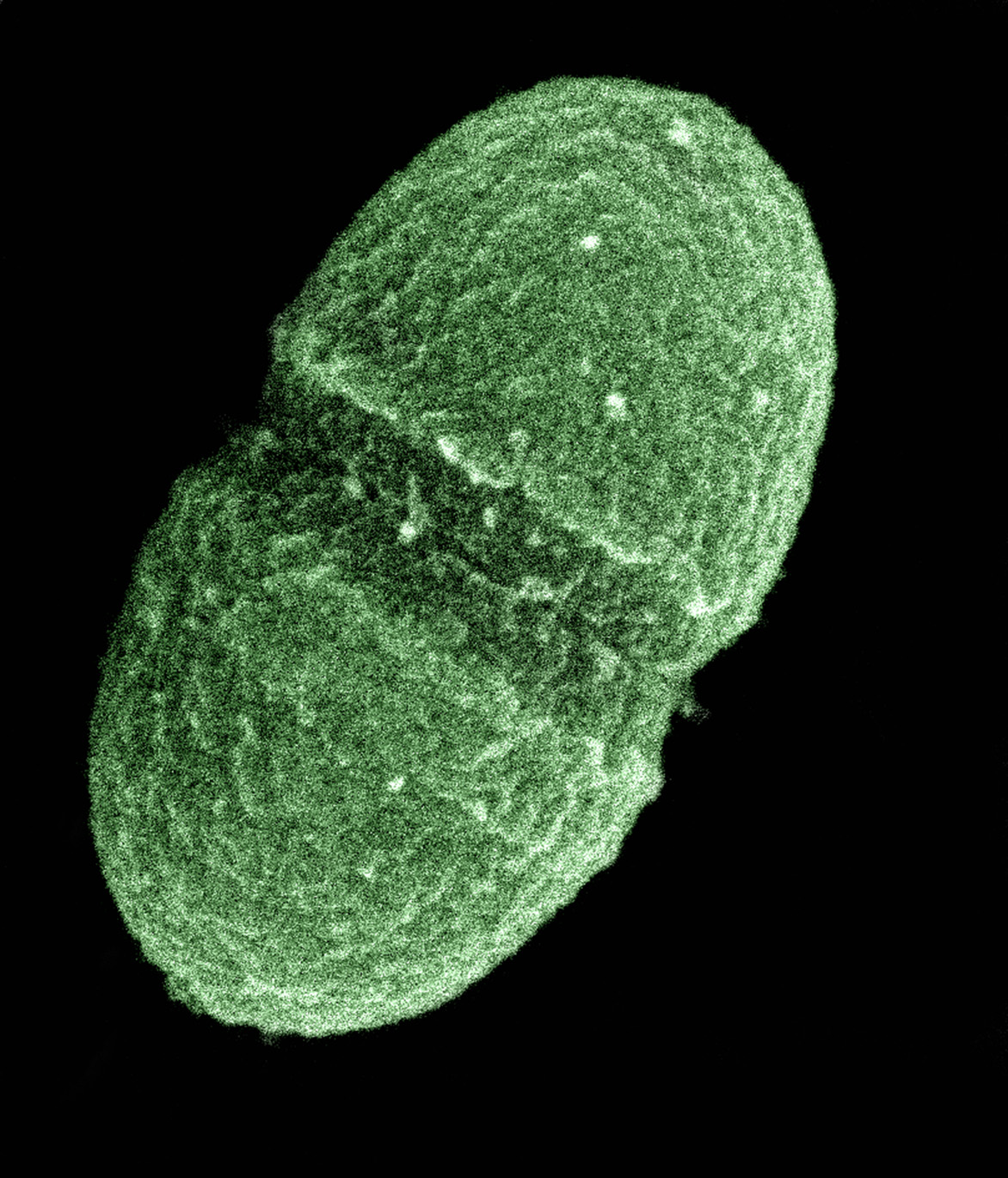

Scientific classification
- Domain: Bacteria
- Kingdom: Bacillati
- Phylum: Bacillota
- Class: Bacilli
- Order: Lactobacillales
- Family: Enterococcaceae
- Genus: Enterococcus
- Species: E. faecalis

Binomial name
- Enterococcus faecalis (Andrewes and Horder, 1906) Schleifer and Kilpper-Bälz, 1984

= Enterococcus faecalis =

Species of bacterium

Enterococcus faecalis – formerly classified as part of the group D Streptococcus, is a Gram-positive, commensal bacterium naturally inhabiting the gastrointestinal tracts of humans. Like other species in the genus Enterococcus, E. faecalis is found in healthy humans and can be used as a probiotic. The probiotic strains such as Symbioflor1 and EF-2001 are characterized by the lack of specific genes related to drug resistance and pathogenesis.

Despite its commensal role, E. faecalis is an opportunistic pathogen that can cause severe infections, especially in nosocomial (hospital) settings. Enterococcus spp. is among the leading causes of healthcare-associated infections ranging from endocarditis to urinary tract infections (UTIs). Hospital-acquired UTIs are associated with catheterization because catheters provide an ideal surface for biofilm formation, allowing E. faecalis to adhere, persist, and evade both the immune response and antibiotic treatment.

E. faecalis can grow in extreme environments due to its highly adaptive genome and lack of strong defense mechanisms. Its ability to easily acquire and transfer genes across species contributes to rising antibiotic resistance. E. faecalis exhibits intrinsic resistance to multiple antibiotics, including oxazolidinones, quinolones, and most β-lactams, such as cephalosporins.

E. faecalis has been frequently found in reinfected root canal-treated teeth, with a prevalence ranging from 30% to 90%. Re-infected root canal-treated teeth are about nine times more likely to harbor E. faecalis than cases of primary infections.

== Physiology ==
E. faecalis is a nonmotile microbe; it ferments glucose without gas production, and does not produce a catalase reaction with hydrogen peroxide. It produces a reduction of litmus milk, but does not liquefy gelatin. It shows consistent growth throughout the nutrient broth, which is consistent with being a facultative anaerobe. It catabolizes a variety of energy sources, including glycerol, lactate, malate, citrate, arginine, agmatine, and many keto acids. Enterococci survive very harsh environments, including extremely alkaline pH (9.6) and salt concentrations. They resist bile salts, detergents, heavy metals, ethanol, azide, and desiccation. They can grow in the range of 10 to 45 °C and survive at temperatures of 60 °C for 30 min.

== Metabolism ==
In clinical settings, E. faecalis displays a relatively conserved metabolic profile compared to other enterococcal species. A recent large-scale study of urinary isolates from ICU patients showed that E. faecalis consistently metabolizes sorbitol, mannitol, amygdalin and sucrose but cannot utilize L-arabinose, melibiose, or raffinose—substrates readily used by E. faecium and E. durans. This substrate profile provides a reliable metabolic signature that can help distinguish E. faecalis from related species in diagnostic and research contexts.

== Pathogenesis ==
E. faecalis is found in most healthy individuals, but can cause endocarditis and sepsis, urinary tract infections (UTIs), meningitis, and other infections in humans. Several virulence factors are thought to contribute to E. faecalis infections. A plasmid-encoded hemolysin, called the cytolysin, is important for pathogenesis in animal models of infection, and the cytolysin in combination with high-level gentamicin resistance is associated with a five-fold increase in risk of death in human bacteremia patients. A plasmid-encoded adhesin called "aggregation substance" is also important for virulence in animal models of infection.

E. faecalis contains a tyrosine decarboxylase enzyme capable of decarboxylating L-DOPA, a crucial drug in the treatment of Parkinson's disease. If L-DOPA is decarboxylated in the gut microbiome, it cannot pass through the blood-brain barrier and be decarboxylated in the brain to become dopamine.

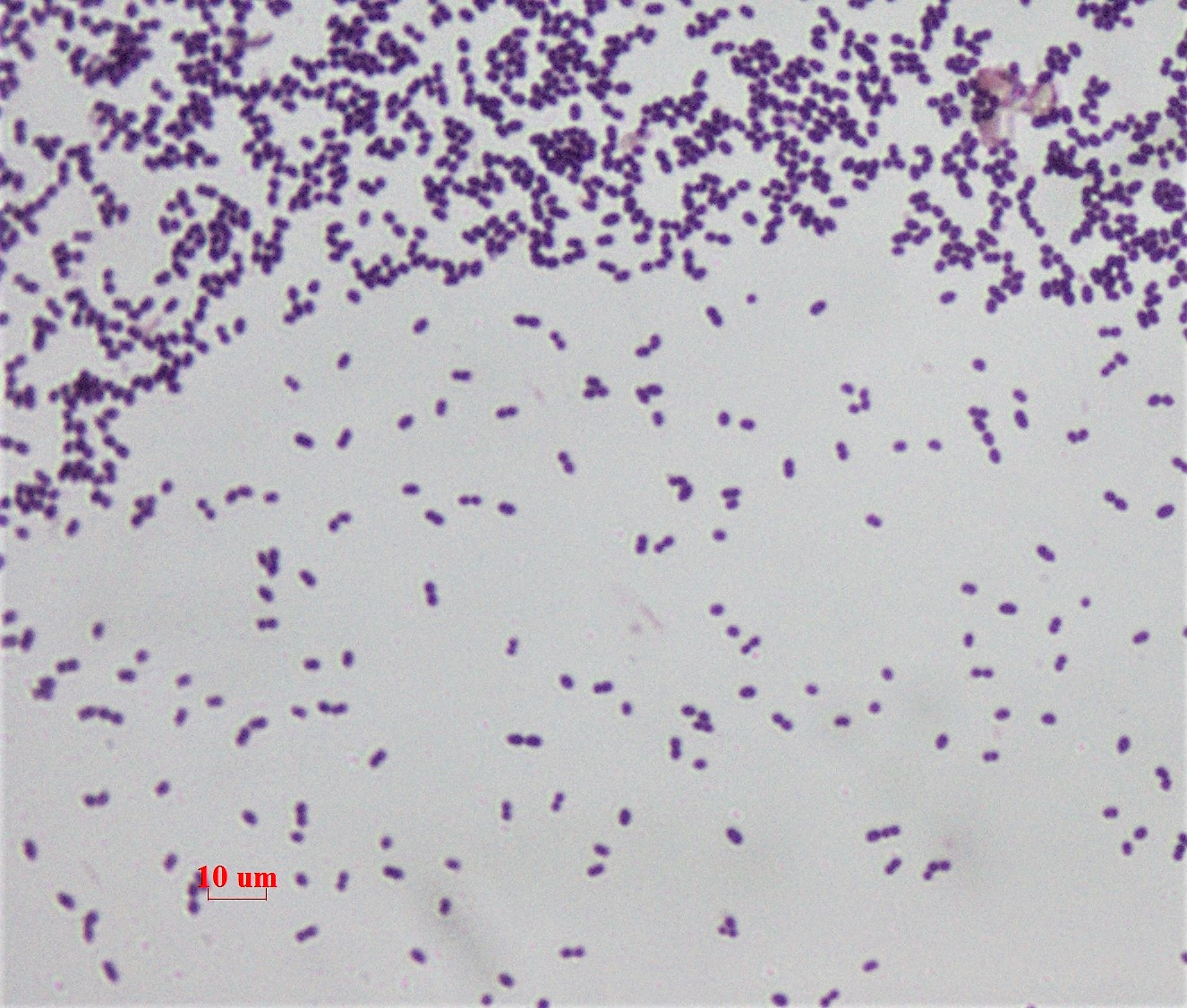
This is a Gram stain for Enterococcus faecalis under 1000 magnification (bright field microscopy).

== Antibacterial resistance ==
=== Multi-drug resistance ===
E. faecalis is usually resistant to many commonly used antimicrobial agents (aminoglycosides, aztreonam and quinolones). The resistance is mediated by the presence of multiple genes related to drug resistance in the chromosome or plasmid.

Resistance to vancomycin in E. faecalis is becoming more common. Treatment options for vancomycin-resistant E. faecalis include nitrofurantoin (in the case of uncomplicated UTIs), linezolid, quinupristin, tigecycline and daptomycin, although ampicillin is preferred if the bacteria are susceptible. Quinupristin/dalfopristin can be used to treat Enterococcus faecium but not E. faecalis.

In root-canal treatments, NaOCl and chlorhexidine (CHX) are used to fight E. faecalis before isolating the canal. However, recent studies determined that NaOCl or CHX showed low ability to eliminate E. faecalis.

=== Combined drug therapies ===
According to one study, combined drug therapy has shown some efficacy in cases of severe infections (e.g., heart valve infections) against susceptible strains of E. faecalis. Ampicillin- and vancomycin-sensitive E. faecalis (lacking high-level resistance to aminoglycosides) strains can be treated by gentamicin and ampicillin antibiotics. A less nephrotoxic combination of ampicillin and ceftriaxone (even though E. faecalis is resistant to cephalosporins, ceftriaxone is working synergistically with ampicillin) may be used alternatively for ampicillin-susceptible E. faecalis.

Daptomycin or linezolid may also show efficacy in cases of ampicillin and vancomycin resistance.

A combination of penicillin and streptomycin therapy was used in the past.

Tedizolid, telavancin, dalbavancin, and oritavancin antibiotics are FDA approved as treatments against EF.

=== Combination of phage therapy and β-lactam antibiotics ===
UTIs are among the most common bacterial infections, and their treatment is becoming increasingly challenging due to the rise of multidrug-resistant E. faecalis strains.Current UTI treatments rely mainly on antibiotics. One promising alternative is the combination of bacteriophage therapy and β-lactam antibiotics. This approach is known as phage-antibiotic synergy (PAS). It has been shown to enhance bacterial elimination, improve biofilm penetration, reduce the emergence of resistant mutants, and increase bacterial susceptibility to antibiotics.

There have been many promising studies about phage-antibiotic synergy with different pathogens such as Pseudomonas aeruginosa or Staphylococcus aureus. With E. faecalis there have been fewer studies, but promising results from a recent study by Moryl et al. (2024) demonstrated that the combination on phage therapy and β-lactam antibiotics enhanced treatment outcomes (more efficient bacteria elimination and increased bacterial sensitivity to antibiotics) and decreased resistance development.

More research is still needed to identify optimal phage-antibiotic combinations and treatment protocols, but this could potentially be considered an alternative treatment for antibiotic-resistant E. faecalis infections in the future.

== Survival and virulence factors ==
- Endures prolonged periods of nutritional deprivation
- Binds to dentin and proficiently spreads into dentinal tubules via chain propagation
- Alters host responses
- Suppresses the action of lymphocytes
- Possesses lytic enzymes, cytolysin, aggregation substance, pheromones, and lipoteichoic acid
- Utilizes serum as a nutritional source
- Produces extracellular superoxide under selected growth conditions that can generate chromosomal instability in mammalian cells
- Resists intracanal medicaments (e.g. calcium hydroxide), although a study proposes elimination from root canals after using a mixture of a tetracycline isomer, an acid, and a detergent
  - Maintains pH homeostasis
  - Properties of dentin lessen the effect of calcium hydroxide
- Competes with other cells
- Forms a biofilm
- Activates the host protease plasminogen in a fashion that increases local tissue destruction

=== DNA repair ===
In human blood, E. faecalis is subjected to conditions that damage its DNA. This damage can be tolerated by the use of DNA repair processes. This damage tolerance depends, in part, on the two protein complex RexAB, encoded by the E. faecalis genome, that is employed in the recombinational repair of DNA double-strand breaks.

=== Biofilm formation ===
The ability of E. faecalis to form biofilms contributes to its capacity to survive in extreme environments. This facilitates its involvement in persistent bacterial infection, particularly multidrug-resistant strains. Biofilm formation in E. faecalis is associated with DNA release, and such release has emerged as a fundamental aspect of biofilm formation. Conjugative plasmid DNA transfer in E. faecalis is enhanced by the release of peptide sex pheromones.

== Historical ==
Before 1984, enterococci were members of the genus Streptococcus; thus, E. faecalis was known as Streptococcus faecalis.

In 2013, a combination of cold denaturation and NMR spectroscopy was used to show detailed insights into the unfolding of the E. faecalis homodimeric repressor protein CylR2.

== Genome structure ==
The E. faecalis genome consists of 3.22 million base pairs and 3,113 protein-coding genes.

== Treatment research ==
Glutamate racemase, hydroxymethylglutaryl-CoA synthase, diphosphomevalonate decarboxylase, topoisomerase DNA gyrase B, D-alanine—D-serine ligase, alanine racemase, phosphate acetyltransferase, NADH peroxidase, Phosphopantetheine adenylyltransferase (PPAT), acyl carrier protein, 3‐Dehydroquinate dehydratase and Deoxynucleotide triphosphate triphosphohydrolase are all potential molecules that may be used for treating EF infections.

Bacillus haynesii CD223 and Advenella mimigardefordensis SM421 can inhibit the growth of Enterococcus faecalis.

== Small RNA ==
Bacterial small RNAs play important roles in many cellular processes; 11 small RNAs have been experimentally characterised in E. faecalis V583 and detected in various growth phases. Five of them have been shown to be involved in stress response and virulence.

A genome-wide sRNA study suggested that some sRNAs are linked to the antibiotic resistance and stress response in another Enterococcus: E. faecium.

== Swimming pool contamination ==
=== Indicators of recreational water quality ===
Because E. faecalis is a common fecal bacterium in humans, recreational water facilities (such as swimming pools and beaches that allow visitors to swim in the ocean) often measure the concentrations of E. faecalis to assess the quality of their water. The higher the concentration, the poorer the water quality. The practice of using E. faecalis as a quality indicator is recommended by the World Health Organization (WHO) as well as many developed countries after multiple studies have reported that higher concentrations of E. faecalis correlate to greater percentages of swimmer illness. This correlation exists in both freshwater and marine environments, so measuring E. faecalis concentrations to determine water quality applies to all recreational waters. However, the correlation does not imply that E. faecalis is the ultimate cause of swimmer illnesses. One alternative explanation is that higher levels of E. faecalis correspond to higher levels of human viruses, which cause sickness in swimmers. Although this claim may sound plausible, there is currently little evidence establishing the link between E. faecalis and human viruses (or other pathogens) levels. Thus, despite the strong correlation between E. faecalis and water quality, more research is needed to determine the causal relationship of this correlation.

=== Human shedding ===
For recreational waters near or at beaches, E. faecalis can come from multiple sources, such as the sand and human bodies. Determining the sources of E. faecalis is crucial for controlling water contamination, though often the sources are non-point (for example, human bathers). As such, one study looked at how much E. faecalis is shed from bathers at the beach. The first group of participants immersed themselves in a large pool of marine water for four 15-minute periods, both with and without contacting sand beforehand. The result shows a decrease in E. faecalis levels for each cycle, suggesting that people shed the most bacteria when they first get into a pool. The second group of participants entered small, individual pools after contact with beach sand, and researchers collected data on how much E. faecalis in the pool came from the sand brought by the participants and how much came from the participants' shedding. The result shows that E. faecalis from the sand is small compared to that from human shedding. Although this result may not apply to all sand types, a tentative conclusion is that human shedding is a major non-point source of E. faecalis in recreational waters.

== See also ==
- Anti-Q RNA
