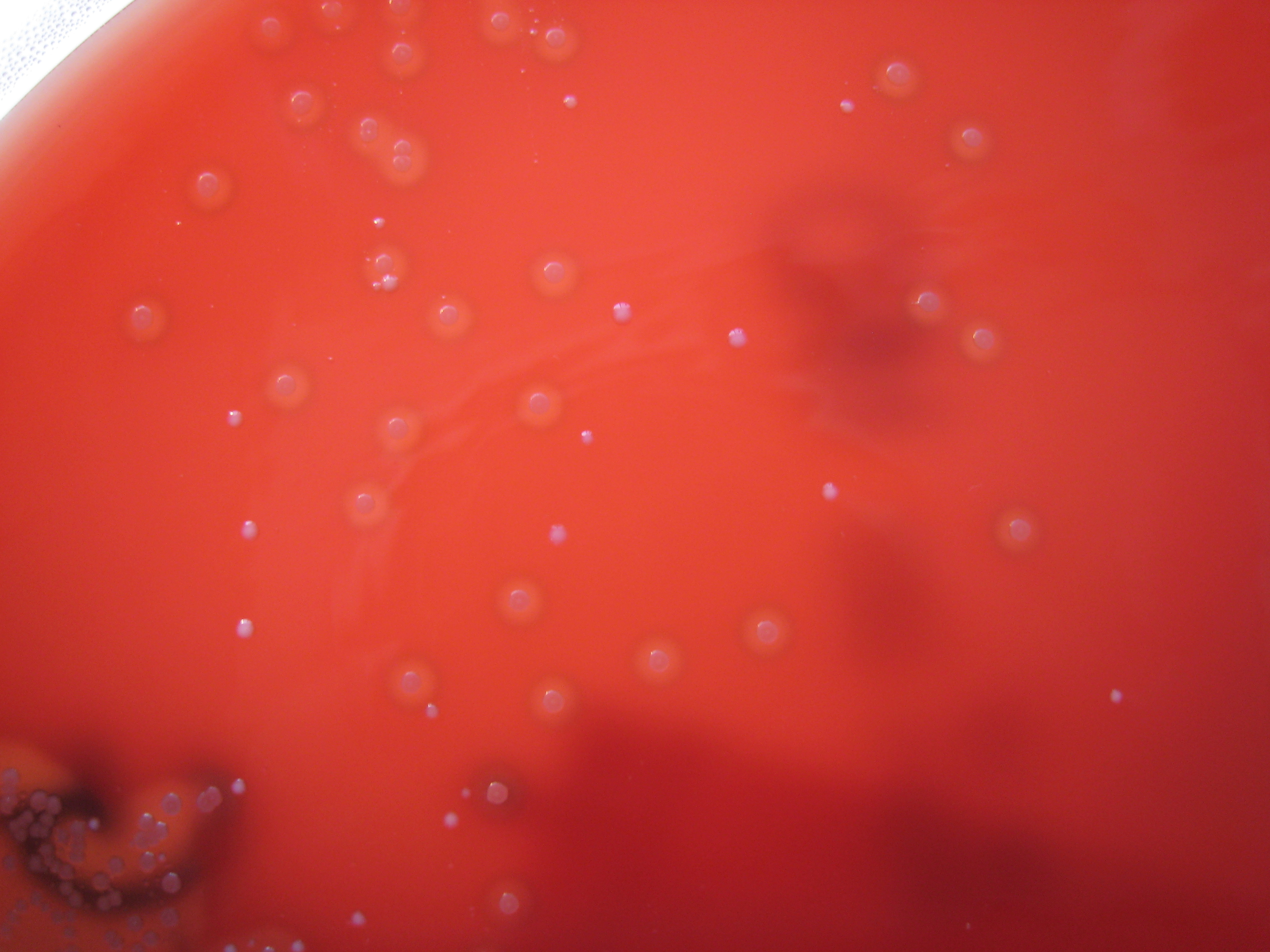
- Streptococcus dysgalactiae - Beta Haemolytic Group G Streptococcus on Columbia Horse Blood Agar

Scientific classification
- Domain: Bacteria
- Kingdom: Bacillati
- Phylum: Bacillota
- Class: Bacilli
- Order: Lactobacillales
- Family: Streptococcaceae
- Genus: Streptococcus
- Species: S. dysgalactiae

Binomial name
- Streptococcus dysgalactiae (ex Diernhofer 1932) Garvie et al. 1983

= Streptococcus dysgalactiae =

Species of bacterium

Streptococcus dysgalactiae is a gram positive, beta-haemolytic, coccal bacterium belonging to the family Streptococcaceae. It is capable of infecting both humans and animals, but is most frequently encountered as a commensal of the alimentary tract, genital tract, or less commonly, as a part of the skin flora. The clinical manifestations in human disease range from superficial skin-infections and tonsillitis, to severe necrotising fasciitis and bacteraemia. The incidence of invasive disease has been reported to be rising. Several different animal species are susceptible to infection by S. dysgalactiae, but bovine mastitis and infectious arthritis in lambs (joint ill) have been most frequently reported.

Streptococcus dysgalactiae is currently divided into the subspecies Streptococcus dysgalactiae subsp. equisimilis and Streptococcus dysgalactiae subsp. dysgalactiae; the former mostly associated with human disease, and the latter almost exclusively encountered in veterinary medicine. Their exact taxonomic delineation, however, is a matter of ongoing debate (See taxonomy).

The names are derived from Greek; Streptococcus meaning chain forming (Streptos) rounded berry-like bodies (kokkos), referring to their usual appearance under a light-microscope. Dys (bad) galactiae (milk) alludes to their propensity to cause bovine mastitis. Equi (horse) similis (like) infers similarity to the closely related species, Streptococcus equi.

== Epidemiology ==
Streptococcus dysgalactiae was long believed to be non-pathogenic to humans. However, an increasing incidence of S. dysgalactiae infections has been documented, and in some geographic regions, the rate of invasive infection has even surpassed that of Streptococcus pyogenes. The age distribution of invasive cases among humans is clearly skewed towards the elderly, whereas the healthy carrier state appears to have the inverse relation to age. People with chronic maladies, including cancer and diabetes, are also especially susceptible to infection. These opportunistic traits have been proposed as one of the mechanisms underlying the observed increasing frequency of invasive disease. Furthermore, a male predominance has been noted, presumably due to a higher burden of comorbidity. The incidence of non-invasive disease in human does not appear to be increasing.

== Role in human disease ==
Streptococcus dysgalactiae subspecies equisimilis is a commensal in human alimentary tract and genital tract. Occasionally it is isolated from skin, but usually in relation to a chronic skin condition or some breach of the epithelial barrier.

Non-invasive disease manifestations include predominantly tonsillitis and superficial skin infections. Additionally, it has long been recognized as a potential cause of cellulitis/erysipelas. However, the role of Streptococcus dysgalactiae subspecies equisimilis in cellulitis might have been previously underestimated, and it was linked to a majority of the cellulitis cases in a recent study.

The clinical presentation among invasive disease is also dominated by skin and soft tissue infections, including a small subset of patients presenting with severe necrotizing fasciitis. Moreover, it is an important cause of bone and joint infections, and this disease manifestation is reported to be increasing. Less commonly it can present as pneumonia, endocarditis, genital or intra-abdominal infections. Primary bacteraemia, infection without identifiable focal origin, comprises approximately 20% of the reported cases.

Recently, Streptococcus dysgalactiae subspecies equisimilis has been linked to post-streptococcal glomerulonephritis and acute rheumatic fever. These immunologic sequelae have previously only been associated with Streptococcus pyogenes. Streptococcus dysgalactiae subspecies dysgalactiae is almost exclusively an animal pathogen. However, a few casuistic reports of human zoonotic infection have been documented.

== Role in animal disease ==
Streptococcus dysgalactiae can infect a range of animal hosts, and both subspecies are of importance. However, the bacterium is frequently encountered as a colonizer of healthy animals, especially in the alimentary tract and genital region.

In veterinary medicine, it is a well-recognized cause of bovine mastitis, hence the name dys-galactiae. In some geographic regions, it is reported only second to Staphylococcus aureus as a cause of both clinical and subclinical mastitis. S. dysgalactiae has been particularly linked to mastitis occurring during the summer time ("Summer mastitis"), and bacterial spreading by flying insects has been suggested. Mastitis in other animals has also been documented.

S. dysgalactiae has been isolated from infectious polyarthritis in several animal species, including piglets, lambs, calves and goats. Furthermore, it has been implicated in neonatal mortality among puppies. Recently, Streptococcus dysgalactiae subspecies dysgalactiae has been described as an emerging pathogen in fish, causing fulminant necrotic ulcers of the caudal peduncle, with ensuing high mortality rates. The clinical presentation is dominated by severe sepsis and the formation of microabscesses, and a relationship between disease severity and the expression of the virulence factors Streptolysin S and SPEGdys has been inferred.

== Treatment and antimicrobial susceptibility ==
Penicillin remains the drug of choice for treating streptococcal infections, and S. dysgalactiae strains with reduced susceptibility to penicillin have never been reported. Treatment duration varies from 5 days to 3 months, depending on the clinical diagnosis. Second-line agents include macrolides and clindamycin, although increasing resistance, due to both efflux and target modification, has been documented in some geographic regions. Aminoglycosides are not active against streptococci due to their lacking respiratory metabolism. However, administered in combination with a beta-lactam antibiotic, aminoglycosides appear to produce a synergistic effect towards streptococci. Streptococcus dysgalactiae is uniformly susceptible to glycopeptides and oxazolidones.

== Taxonomy ==
Diernhofer first used the name Streptococcus dysgalactiae in 1932, describing a streptococcus of veterinary origin. Subsequently, Frost reported the discovery of the human pathogen Streptococcus equisimilis in 1936. Contemporarily, though, Rebecca Lancefield devised a classification of streptococci based on their carbohydrate-antigens, and successively described streptococci belonging to group C (1933) and group G (1935). The correlation of group carbohydrate specificity with the proposed species S. dysgalactiae and S. equisimilis, however, were not explored in detail. The Lancefield classification soon became the preferred laboratory identification method for streptococci, and the names S. dysgalactiae and S. equisimilis fell into disuse. In 1980, they were even removed from the List of Approved Bacterial species. Three years later, though, DNA hybridization studies revealed extensive similarities between the entities Streptococcus dysgalactiae, Streptococcus equisimilis, large-colony-forming group C and group G streptococcus of human origin, and certain large-colony-forming group C, G and L streptococci of animal origin. Accordingly, they were fused to one species, Streptococcus dysgalactiae. However, subsequent molecular investigations indicated heterogeneity within this new species, and in 1996 it was divided into S. dysgalactiae subspecies equisimilis and S. dysgalactiae subspecies dysgalactiae.

The taxonomic division of Streptococcus dysgalactiae into its two subspecies has been the origin of much confusion, and a matter of ongoing debate. Although no official taxonomic gold standard exists, the most current and widely supported definition was published by Vieira et al. in 1998. It defines S. dysgalactiae subspecies dysgalactiae solely as the alpha-haemolytic phenotype harbouring the Lancefield group C antigen. The rest are classified as S. dysgalactiae subspecies equisimilis, are (mostly) beta-haemolytic and can harbour carbohydrate antigens of Lancefield group A, C, G or L. However, a recent study indicates that the Streptococcus dysgalactiae subspecies equisimilis strains of animal and human origin are genetically divergent, and future taxonomic reclassifications are conceivable.

== Laboratory identification ==
Streptococcus dysgalactiae form large colonies (>0.5 cm) after 24 hours of incubation, and produce haemolysis on blood agar; Streptococcus dysgalactiae subspecies dysgalactiae is alpha-haemolytic, whereas Streptococcus dysgalactiae subspecies equisimilis is predominantly beta-haemolytic. They are facultative anaerobic, incapable of respiratory metabolism, but are aerotolerant. Growth is enhanced by incubation in 5% CO_{2} atmosphere, but they usually grow adequately in ambient air. The optimum temperature for growth is approximately 37 °C. Lancefield group C and G carbohydrate antigens are predominantly expressed, but group A and L have been documented. However, the above characteristics are not unique to S. dysgalactiae, and further testing is required to confirm the species identity. Although many laboratories currently identify bacteria by mass-spectrometry (Matrix Assisted Laser Desorption/ionization Time Of Flight MALDI TOF MS), phenotypic testing is still widely used. Unlike Streptococcus pyogenes (harbouring Lancefield group A antigen), S. dysgalactiae is PYR-negative and Bacitracin resistant. The distinction from the Streptococcus anginosus group (Lancefield A, C, G or F) can be made by colony size and Voges Proskauer test (VP); the S.anginosus group being VP positive. Streptococcus equi contains Lancefield group C, and Streptococcus canis harbours group G, but unlike S. dysgalactiae, they are both Hyaluronidase negative.

The identification of S. dysgalactiae to the subspecies level is most reliably performed by multilocus sequence typing. MALDI TOF MS does currently not possess taxonomic resolution beyond the species level.

== Molecular typing ==
Several different typing systems for Streptococcus dysgalactiae have been used, the majority originally devised for the closely related species Streptococcus pyogenes. The most widely employed method is emm-typing. The emm-gene encodes the M-protein, a major virulence factor in both S. pyogenes and Streptococcus dysgalactiae. It is ubiquitous in Streptococcus dysgalactiae subspecies equisimilis of human origin, and its hypervariability in the 5'-terminal region forms the basis for categorization into separate emm-types. To date, more than 100 Streptococcus dysgalactiae subspecies equisimilis emm-types have been described (CDC Strep Lab). The prevailing emm-types vary in different geographical regions, and clonal outbreaks have been reported. Unlike for S. pyogenes, a correlation between emm-type and disease manifestation or severity has not been established for S. dysgalactiae. Pulsed-field gel electrophoresis has historically been employed for the exploration of clonal relationships among S. dysgalactiae, but with the increased availability and reduced costs of sequencing, it is likely to be replaced by multilocus sequence typing and single-nucleotide polymorphism analysis.

== Pathogenesis and virulence factors ==
The pathogenetic pathways of Streptococcus dysgalactiae have not been explored in detail. Several virulence factors have been identified, but predominantly by screening S. dysgalactiae isolates for homologues of well-characterized S. pyogenes virulence genes. In a study of 216 S. pyogenes virulence genes, S. dysgalactiae was found to harbour approximately half of them. Indeed, whole-genome comparisons reveal a 70% -genetic similarity between the two species, indicating a common genetic ancestry. However, evidence of horizontal genetic transfer has also been reported.

The first pivotal step in infectious pathogenesis is the attachment to the host tissues. The M-protein, the most extensively studied Streptococcus dysgalactiae subspecies equisimilis virulence factor, has been documented to facilitate both adherence to and internalization into host cells. Other adhesins have also been described, including the genes gfba, fnB, fbBA, fnBB, lmb and gapC; all mediating binding to fibronectin. gfba was recently shown contribute to bacterial internalization into endothelial cells and intracellular persistence. These properties may explain the tendency of recurrent bacteraemia observed in human cases caused by Streptococcus dysgalactiae subspecies equisimilis .

In order to establish infection, the bacteria need to escape the host immune response, and in streptococci, a varied arsenal of bacterial strategies have been described. The M-protein aids in immune evasion by inhibiting phagocytosis and inactivating the complement system. Furthermore, Streptococcus dysgalactiae possesses protein G, a virulence factor binding circulating immunoglobulins, and thus interfering with the host antibody response. DrsG, a virulence protein abrogating the effect of antimicrobial peptides secreted by human immune cells, is also harboured by a subset of strains of Streptococcus dysgalactiae subspecies equisimilis.

Several toxins and secreted enzymes have been identified in Streptococcus dysgalactiae, including the haemolysins Streptolysin O (SLO) and Streptolysin S (SLS), and a correlation between the expression of SLO and SLS and disease severity has been inferred. speGdys, a homolog of the S. pyogenes superantigen speG, has been documented in some S. dysgalactiae strains. However, it only appears to possess superantigen-capabilities in animals, and its relevance in human disease has yet to be elucidated. Streptokinase appears to be ubiquitous in S. dysgalactiae, enabling fibrinolysis and aiding in bacterial spreading through tissues.

Recently, a capacity to form biofilm was reported, facilitating survival and proliferation in hostile environments. Although this potentially could have implications for the treatment of S. dysgalactiae-infections, its clinical significance has not yet been determined.
