= RivX sRNA =

RivX
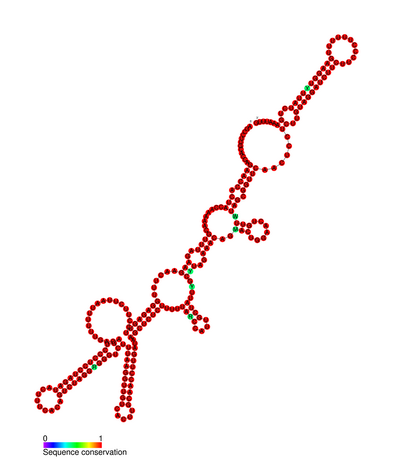
- Predicted secondary structure of RivX sRNA

Identifiers
- Symbol: RivX

Other data
- RNA type: sRNA
- Domain: Streptococcus pyogenes
- PDB structures: PDBe

RivX sRNA is a non-coding RNA molecule involved in the interface between two key regulators of virulence in the human pathogen Streptococcus pyogenes (Group A Streptoccus, also known as GAS): the CovR/S system and Mga regulator. This RNA, along with its downstream protein-coding gene RivR, are the first discovered links between these two important regulation networks. An extra protein linking the two pathways, TrxR, was described a year later. The adjoining of these two pathways could allow a consistently high virulence of S. pyogenes despite a variety of environmental conditions.

RivX is thought to be co-transcribed with RivR mRNA before post-transcriptional processing releases the sRNA. It was found to be a non-coding transcript through site-directed mutagenesis experimentation.

In total, the GAS genome is now predicted to encode 75 total sRNAs, a number approximately equal to the number of transcription factors encoded by the genome, which shows the importance of RNA regulation in GAS.
