= Friedrich Fehleisen =

German bacteriologist (1852–1915)

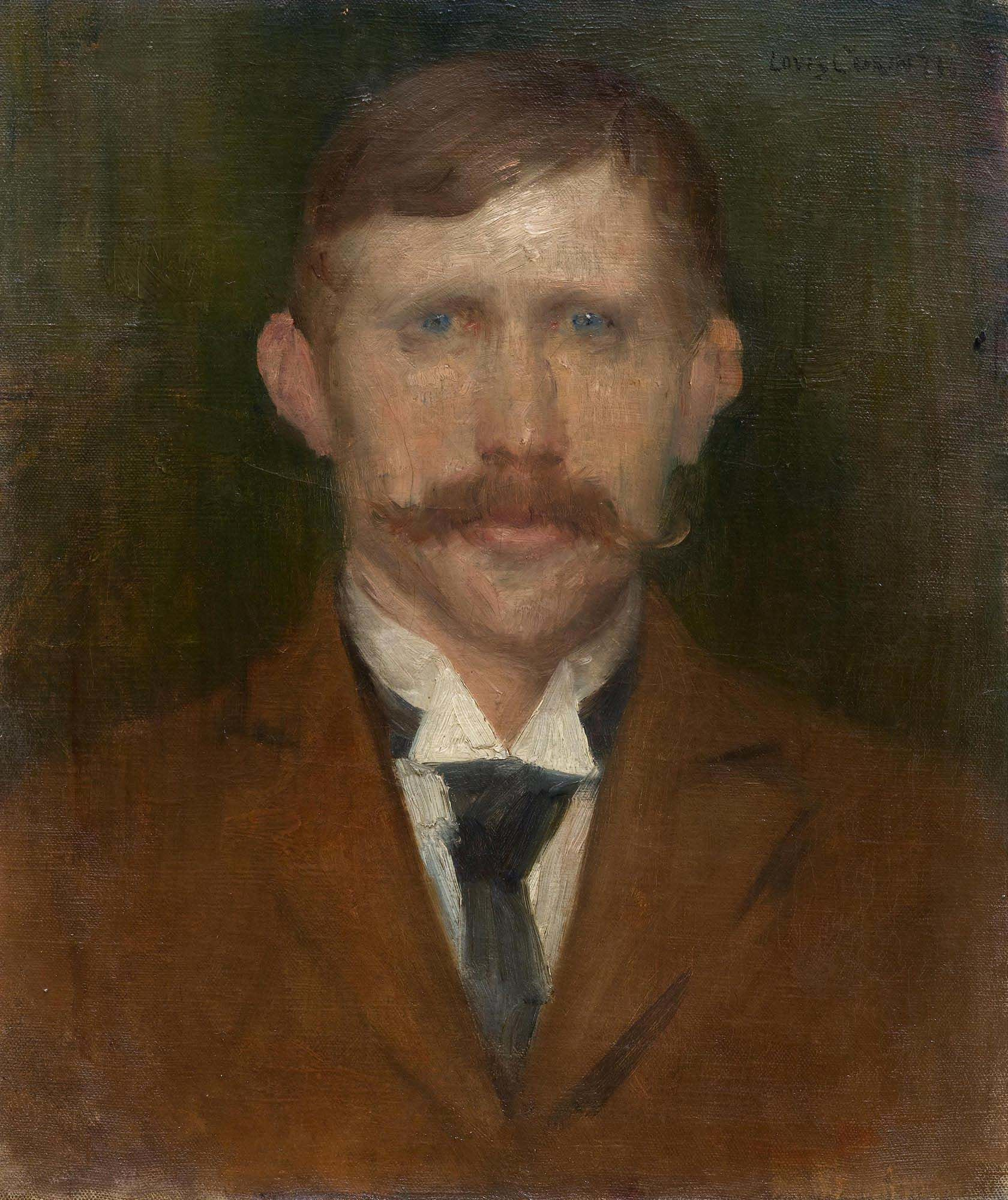
- Portrait of Herr Fehleisen by Lovis Corinth
- Born: 1854; Reutlingen, Württemberg
- Died: 1924 (aged 69–70); San Francisco, California
- Citizenship: German
- Known for: Streptococcus pyogenes, immunotherapy
- Scientific career
- Fields: Bacteriology

Friedrich Fehleisen (/ˈfeːlaɪ̯sən/) (1854–1924) was a German surgeon whose work focused on streptococcal bacteria. Dr. Fehleisen's work played a necessary role in the eventual uncovering of the etiology of many streptococcal illnesses. He made integral contributions to modern medicine's understanding of the Streptococcus pyogenes organism. He was born in Reutlingen, Württemberg, in 1854, and died in San Francisco, California, in 1924.

== S. pyogenes and erysipelas ==
Fehleisen is notable as the first person to identify the cause of both erysipelas and scarlet fever as the bacterium Streptococcus pyogenes in 1883. Fehleisen cultured the bacillus from erysipelas lesions from human subjects. Working on bacteria that infect wounds in 1884, Rosenbach would describe the same organism. Rosenbach gave it the name Streptococcus pyogenes. The German physician Friedrich Loeffler would demonstrate the presence of S. pyogenes streptococci in the throats of patients with scarlet fever.

== Cancer immunotherapy ==
The first scientific attempts to modulate a patients’ immune response against cancer can be attributed to two German physicians, Wilhelm Busch and Frederich Fehleisen. In 1868, Busch took the bold step of inoculating a sarcoma patient with erysipelas after observing a spontaneous cure of a patient with a similar sarcoma after happening to acquire a case of the bacterial infection. Fehleisen felt he could control the outcome and began experimenting with injecting small doses of live bacteria into the tumors. His first patient, a 58-year-old woman with a fibrosarcoma of the gluteus, showed significant remission in the very large tumor, although the very high fever of 41 °C made Fehleisen question the utility of this method as a therapy. He noted regression in many of the cases, but only if he was able to induce and maintain a fever in the patient.

Fehleisen observations later inspired William Coley to try the method on his patients and eventually developing Coley's toxins.
