= RopB transcriptional regulator =

Transcription factor found in Streptococcus pyogenese

RopB Transcriptional Regulator
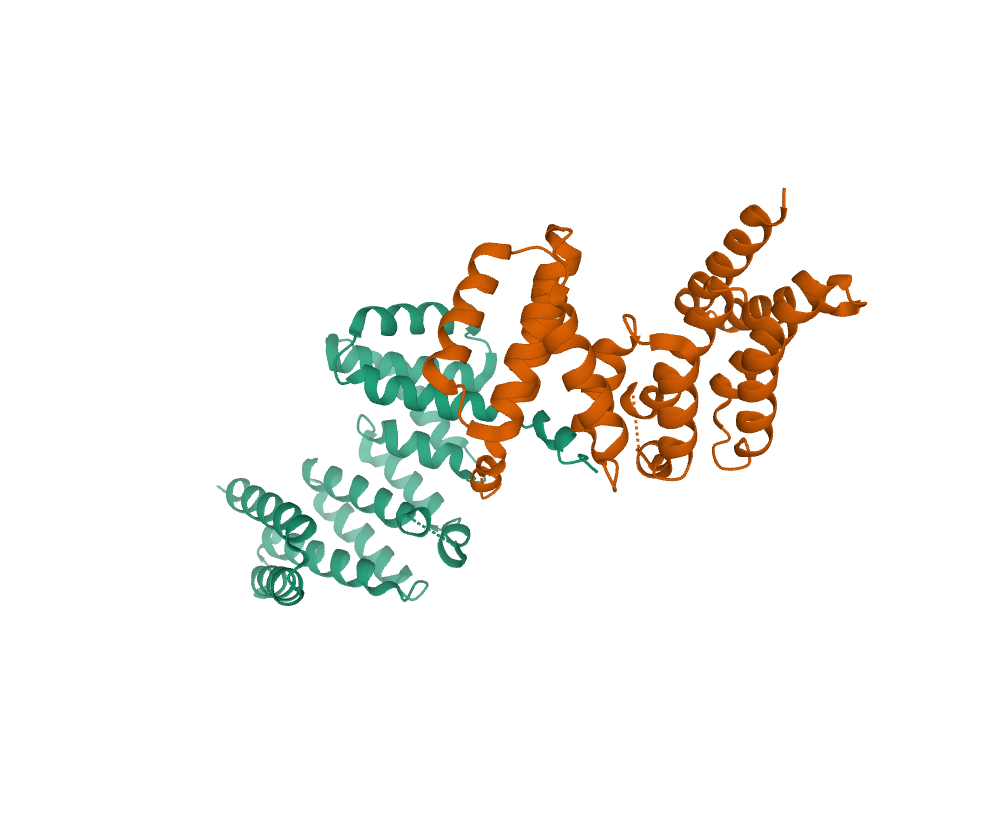
- Crystal structure of ropB

Identifiers
- Organism: Streptococcus pyogenes
- Symbol: rgg
- Alt. symbols: ropB
- Entrez: 46807574
- Orthologs: NCBI: entry; OMA: entry
- PDB: 5DL2
- RefSeq (Prot): WP_002982409.1
- UniProt: D3KVD8

Other data
- Chromosome: Genomic: 1.78 - 1.78 Mb
Search for
- Structures: Swiss-model
- Domains: InterPro

RopB transcriptional regulator, also known as RopB/Rgg transcriptional regulator, is a transcriptional regulator protein that regulates expression of the extracellularly secreted cysteine protease streptococcal pyrogenic exotoxin B (speB or streptopain), which is an important virulence factor of Streptococcus pyogenes and is responsible for the dissemination of a host of infectious diseases including strep throat, impetigo, streptococcal toxic shock syndrome, necrotizing fasciitis, and scarlet fever. Functional studies suggest that the ropB multigene regulon is responsible for not only global regulation of virulence but also a wide range of functions from stress response, metabolic function, and two-component signaling. Structural studies implicate ropB's regulatory action being reliant on a complex interaction involving quorum sensing with the leaderless peptide signal speB-inducing peptide (SIP) acting in conjunction with a pH sensitive histidine switch.

== Discovery ==
Observations of an extracellularly secreted glucosyltransferase (gtfG) sequentially proximal to and activated by an rgg gene with inverted repeats in the intergenic region of Streptococcus gordonii served as a basis for studying its homology between Streptococcus pyogenes. It was discovered that S. pyogenes also shared an rgg/ropB gene located directly next to the subject of its transcriptional regulation, in this case speB protease, with intergenic inverted repeats. Confirmation of linkage between rgg/ropB and speB secretion activation was achieved by means of ropB insertional disruption which resulted in decreased speB production.

== Structure ==
=== Gene location ===
The location of the ropB gene is directly and sequentially proximal to the subject of its transcriptional regulation, speB, which lies downstream of a 941 bp intergenic region between the two. Transcription of the ropB gene seems to necessitate a promoter within a series sequences between 238 and 480 bp and up to 800 bp upstream of the gene itself inside the highly repetitive intergenic region.

=== Protein binding location ===
The ropB protein binding location lies adjacent to speB promoter 1 that is also located within the highly repetitive intergenic region, although the ropB gene and the speB gene are transcribed in opposite directions. The -10 and -35 regions of speB promoter 1 have poor consensus; in order to ameliorate this, the ropB aids the RNA polymerase bondage with the help of a polyU polypyrimidine tract inside the palindromic inverted repeat region in a fashion uncannily similar to intrinsic termination in E. coli.

=== Protein domains ===
==== N-Terminal ====
The N-terminal domain consists of amino acids 1-56 and is an amino terminal responsible for DNA-binding and is a key mediator in the linkage between the C-terminal domain of the opposite dimer. The dimer interface II has its I255 side chain located in the N-terminal.

==== C-Terminal ====
The C-terminal domain, also known as ropB-CTD, is a carboxy terminalligand-binding domain made of amino acids 56–280. RopB-CTD houses 5 TPR motifs and attaches to the SIP peptide in the innermost part of the SIP binding pocket in a sequence-specific manner without induction of polymerization.

==== TPR domain ====
The tetratricopeptide repeat domain provides the concave surface necessitated for SIP recognition. RopB-CTD houses 5 stacked TPR motifs, each having sets of paired antiparallel helices that aid in the formation of a concave inner pathway and a convex exterior. The base of the recognition site is constructed by alpha helices α6 and α8, while the supporting walls are constructed from helices α2, and α12. The exterior portion of the recognition site is flanked by asparagines N152 and N192, thus providing a ridge of support for the peptide-protein complex.

==== Dimer interface ====
The dimer interfaces of ropB are constructed by a union of the α8 - α12 helices of the N-terminal domain and the C-terminal domain. Additionally, there is an Interface I forged from three side chains (C22, Y224, and R226), an Interface II forged from one side chain (I255), and N-terminal domains that are all responsible for dimerizing ropB protein subunits together.

==== Peptide binding pocket ====
The SIP peptide binding pocket is the docking station of the eight amino acid leaderless peptide signal, speB-inducing peptide (SIP). The binding pocket is a tripartite construction of the C-terminal's α12 helix which is a capping helix, TPR3's α6 helix that has a hydrophobic interplay with SIP sidechains, and TPR 4's α8 helix which electrostatically stabilizes SIP. Variations in pH level altered strength of adherence between SIP and the SIP binding pocket with acidic pH levels between 5.5 and 6.5 enhancing adherence and pH levels between 7 and 9 reducing adherence.

==== Histidine switch ====
Though the ropB protein has seven histidines (H12, H81, H93, H144, H265, H266, and H277) structurally present, the ropB histidine switch primarily operates with a single functionally involved histidine (H144) conveniently placed to associate with ropB sidechains (Y176 and E185) that near each other upon the addition of a hydrogen ion to H144 in acidic conditions. Only one histidine (H12) is located on the N-domain while the rest lie in the C-terminal domain.

== Regulon kinetics ==
Streptococcus pyogenes has evolved an interwoven complex of gene regulatory mechanisms in the SIP signaling pathway by implanting a pH sensitive histidine switch onto the quorum-sensing ropB protein. During the neutral to basic pH conditions whether synthetically induced or naturally caused by low population density of S. pyogenes, the interaction between the unprotonated functionally involved histidine (H144) with relevant sidechains (Y176, Y182, E185) in the SIP binding pocket domain is impaired and speB protease expression is inhibited. On the other hand, as extracellular pH decreases to be more acidic in cases of high population density, S. pyogenes has no elaborate pH homeostatic capabilities relative to non-lactic bacteria, therefore intracellular cytosolic pH levels will more easily resemble extracellular levels. Cytosolic acidification mobilizes the SIP pathway to allow for the SIP-ropB protein complex to form and increasing SIP production. Furthermore, increased cytosolic acidity enhances the maturation of speB zymogen (speBz) into mature speB protease (speBm) to dramatically increase its proteolytic activity and virulence.

== Homology ==
=== Rgg family ===
Rgg-like transcriptional regulators can be found in a variety of gram-positive bacteria. Where ropB regulates speB protease production in S. pyogenes, a roughly equivalent secretory control mechanism can be seen in Rgg's regulation of gtfG glucosyltransferase production in S. gordonii, in the manner in which gadR regulates acid resistance in Lactococcus lactis, how lasX regulates expression of lantibiotic lactocin S in Lactobacillus sakei, and mutR's regulation of mutacin in S. mutans. Sequentially, these genes are all localized contiguously to their respective subject of regulation and share promoters localized contiguously to inverted repeat regions.

=== RRNPP family ===
Characterization of the RRNPP family of quorum-sensing regulators (which stands for proteins Rap, NprR, PrgX, PlcRd) were used in comparisons with ropB to postulate its structural functions. The Rap protein derived from Bacilli regulates sporulation, the NprR protein in Bacillus thuringiensis regulates necrotrophism, the PrgX protein regulates conjugation in Enterococcus faecalis, and PlcR protein regulates transcription of virulence factors in both Bacillis thuringiensis and Bacillus cereus. Similarities were observed in conserved asparagine residues on the TPR motifs of each of these proteins and in ropB.

=== Quorum sensing ===
Quorum sensing regulates a menagerie of aspects in Bacillota including the production of ropB-like proteins in Streptococcus pneumoniae and S. pyogenes. Similarities in the pH sensitivity of the cell signaling mechanisms were found in pneumococci, S. mutans, and Staphylococcus aureus as well.

=== pH sensitive histidine switch ===
Amongst Rgg-like proteins, it has been observed that the pH sensitive histidine (particularly H144) and interacting amino acids (Y176, Y182, and E185) of ropB of Streptococcus pyogenes are conserved in S. porcinus, S. pseudoporcinus, S. salivarius, L. pentosus, L. aviaries, L. reuteri, and Enterococcus sp. including E. faecalis. Thus, suggesting the usage of a pH sensitive histidine switch complex with gene-regulating effector molecules in a slew of other bacteria [See Also: allosteric regulation].

== Pathogenesis ==
RopB regulation speB is a key determinant in the expression of the speB proteinase which is a primary virulence factor and the most abundant extracellular protein in streptococcal secretions. SpeB cleaves host serum proteins that make up the human extracellular matrix and bacterial proteins including other secreted streptococcal proteins. As previously mentioned, it is responsible for the dissemination of a host of infectious diseases including but not limited to pharyngitis, impetigo, streptococcal toxic shock syndrome, necrotizing fasciitis, and scarlet fever. Therefore, study of the inactivation of speB's many functional pathways and regulators are of critical importance in developing potential novel therapeutics.

== See also ==
- Erythrogenic toxins
- Allosteric regulation
- Alpha helix
