= Mga (protein) =

Identifiers
- Symbol: Mga
- Pfam: PF05043
- Pfam clan: CL0123
- InterPro: IPR007737
Available protein structures:
- PDB: IPR007737 PF05043 (ECOD; PDBsum)
- AlphaFold: IPR007737; PF05043

Mga is a DNA-binding protein that activates the expression of several important virulence genes in Streptococcus pyogenes (group A Streptococcus, GAS) in response to changing environmental conditions. The family also contains VirR like proteins which match only at the C-terminus.

Mga is a wide-reaching regulator, affecting gene expression in over 10% of the S. pyogenes genome. The other large regulator of virulence in GAS is the CovR/S two-component system, which affects the expression of approximately 15% of the genome. The two systems are linked through another protein, RivR, and a small non-coding RNA RivX.
