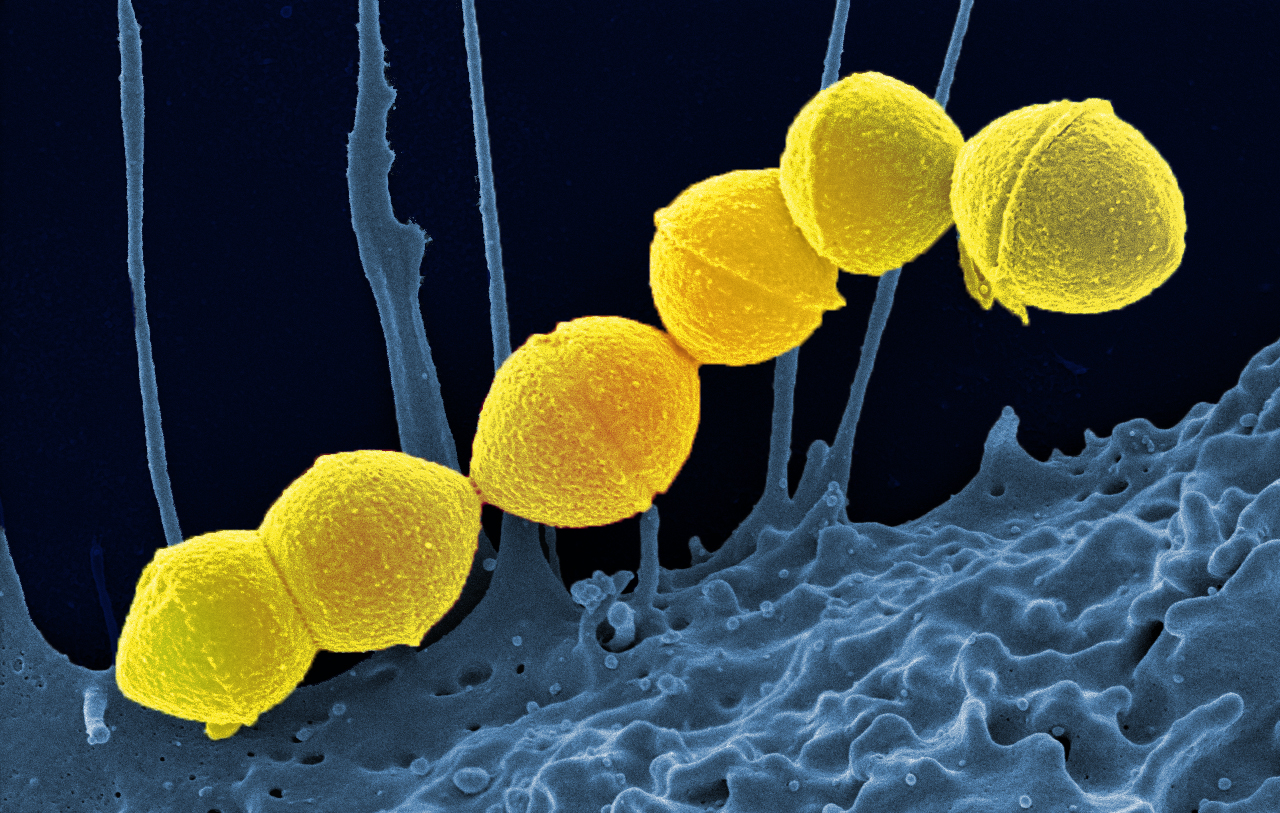
- False-color scanning electron micrograph of chain of Streptococcus pyogenes bacteria (yellow)

Scientific classification
- Domain: Bacteria
- Kingdom: Bacillati
- Phylum: Bacillota
- Class: Bacilli
- Order: Lactobacillales
- Family: Streptococcaceae
- Genus: Streptococcus
- Species: S. pyogenes

Binomial name
- Streptococcus pyogenes Rosenbach 1884

= Streptococcus pyogenes =

Species of bacterium

Streptococcus pyogenes is a species of Gram-positive, aerotolerant bacteria in the genus Streptococcus. These bacteria are extracellular, and made up of non-motile and non-sporing cocci (round cells) that tend to link in chains. They are clinically important for humans, as they are an infrequent, but usually pathogenic, part of the skin microbiota that can cause group A streptococcal infection. S. pyogenes is the predominant species harboring the Lancefield group A antigen, and is often called group A Streptococcus (GAS). The name group A (beta-hemolytic) Streptococcus is thus also used.

The species name is derived from Greek words meaning 'a chain' (streptos) of berries (coccus [Latinized from kokkos]) and pus (pyo)-forming (genes), since a number of infections caused by the bacterium produce pus. The main criterion for differentiation between Staphylococcus spp. and Streptococcus spp. is the catalase test. Staphylococci are catalase-positive whereas streptococci are catalase-negative. S. pyogenes can be cultured on fresh blood agar plates. The PYR test allows for the differentiation of Streptococcus pyogenes from other morphologically similar beta-hemolytic streptococci (including S. dysgalactiae subsp. esquismilis) as S. pyogenes will produce a positive test result.

An estimated 700 million GAS infections occur worldwide each year. While the overall mortality rate for these infections is less than 0.1%, over 650,000 of the cases are severe and invasive, and these cases have a mortality rate of 25%. Early recognition and treatment are critical; diagnostic failure can result in sepsis and death. S. pyogenes is clinically and historically significant as the cause of scarlet fever, which results from exposure to the species' exotoxin.

== Epidemiology ==
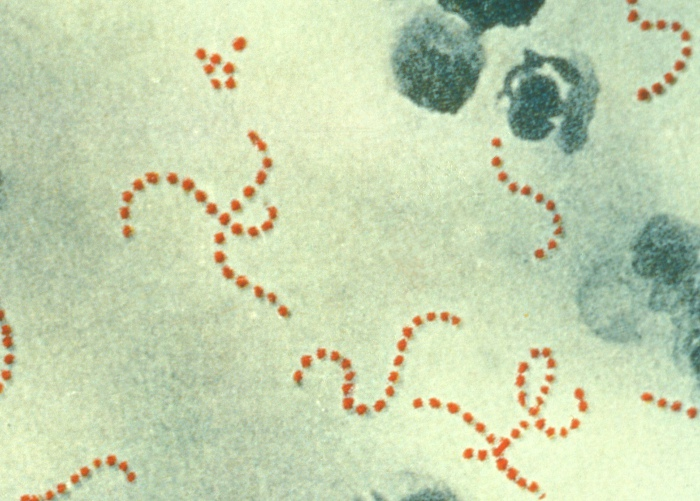
Chains of S. pyogenes bacteria (orange) at 900× magnification

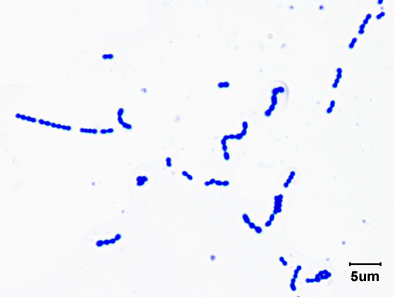
Gram stain of Streptococcus pyogenes

Unlike most bacterial pathogens, S. pyogenes only infects humans. Thus, zoonotic transmission from an animal (or animal products) to a human is rare.

S. pyogenes typically colonizes the throat, genital mucosa, rectum, and skin. Of healthy adults, 1% to 5% have throat, vaginal, or rectal carriage, with children being more common carriers. Most frequently, transmission from one person to another occurs due to inhalation of respiratory droplets, produced by sneezing and coughing from an infected person. Skin contact, contact with objects harboring the bacterium, and consumption of contaminated food are possible but uncommon modes of transmission. Streptococcal pharyngitis occurs most frequently in late winter to early spring in most countries as indoor spaces are used more often and thus more crowded. Disease cases are the lowest during autumn.

Maternal S. pyogenes infection usually happens in late pregnancy, at more than 30 weeks of gestation to four weeks postpartum. Maternal infections account for 2 to 4% of all clinically diagnosed S. pyogenes infections. The risk of sepsis is relatively high compared to other bacterial infections acquired during pregnancy, and S. pyogenes is a leading cause of septic shock and death in pregnant and postpartum women.

== Bacteriology ==
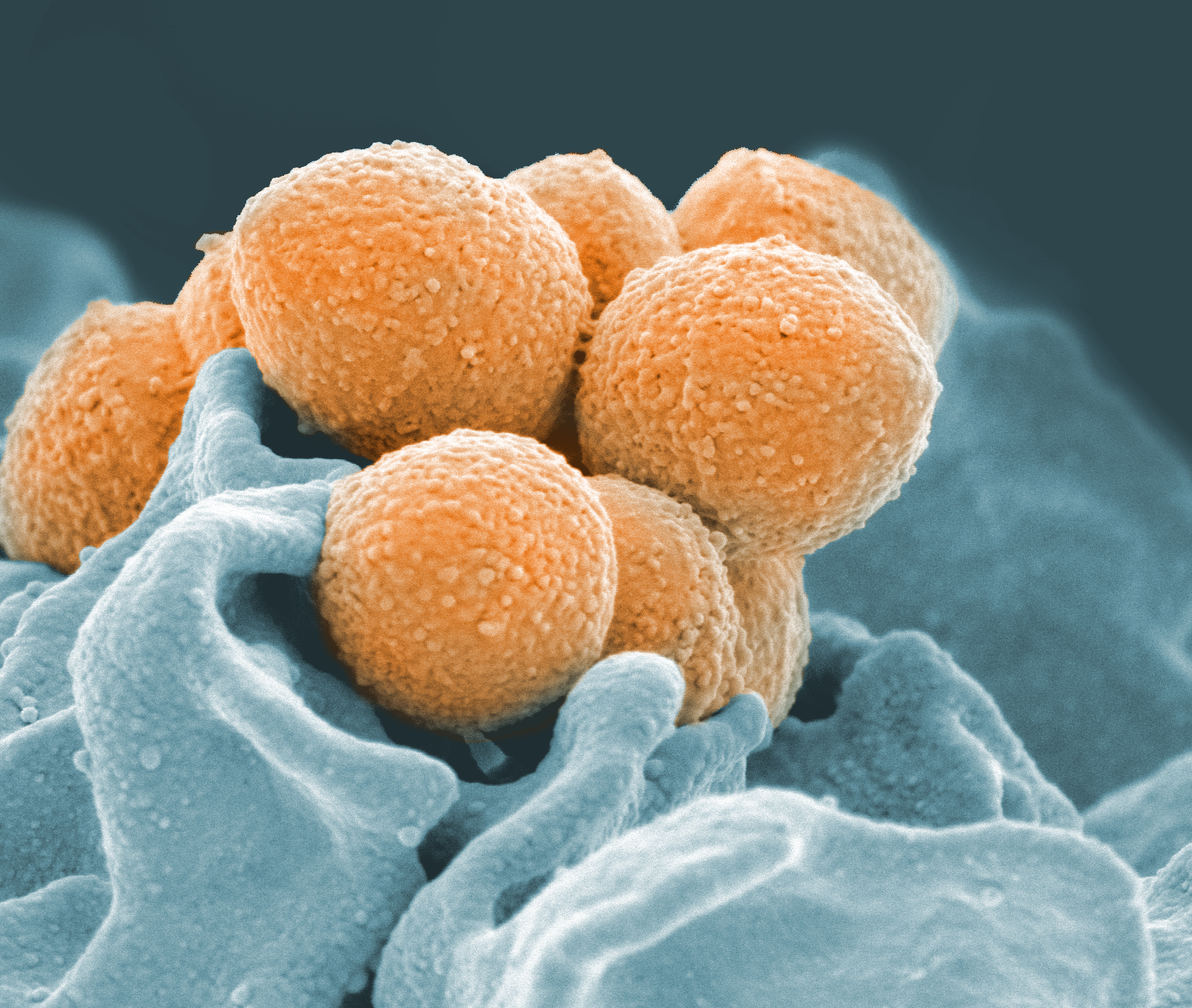
False-color scanning electron microscope image of Streptococcus pyogenes (orange) during phagocytosis with a human neutrophil (blue)

=== Serotyping ===
In 1928, Rebecca Lancefield published a method for serotyping S. pyogenes based on its cell-wall polysaccharide, a virulence factor displayed on its surface. Care should be taken when using lancefield antigen typing to identify S. pyogenes as Streptococcus dysgalactiae and the Streptococcus anginosus group can possess group A antigen as well. Later, in 1946, Lancefield described the serologic classification of S. pyogenes isolates based on components of their surface pili (known as the T-antigen) which are used by bacteria to attach to host cells. As of 2016, a total of 120 M proteins have been identified. These M proteins are encoded by 234 type emm genes with greater than 1,200 alleles.

=== Lysogeny ===
All strains of S. pyogenes are polylysogenized, in that they carry one or more bacteriophage in their genomes. Some of the phages may be defective, but in some cases active phage may compensate for defects in others. In general, the genome of S. pyogenes strains isolated during disease are >90% identical, they differ by the phage they carry.

=== Virulence factors ===
S. pyogenes has several virulence factors that enable it to attach to host tissues, evade the immune response, and spread by penetrating host tissue layers. A carbohydrate-based bacterial capsule composed of hyaluronic acid surrounds the bacterium, protecting it from phagocytosis by neutrophils. In addition, the capsule and several factors embedded in the cell wall, including M protein, lipoteichoic acid, and protein F (SfbI) facilitate attachment to various host cells. M protein also inhibits opsonization by the alternative complement pathway by binding to host complement regulators. The M protein found on some serotypes is also able to prevent opsonization by binding to fibrinogen. However, the M protein is also the weakest point in this pathogen's defense, as antibodies produced by the immune system against M protein target the bacteria for engulfment by phagocytes. M proteins are unique to each strain, and identification can be used clinically to confirm the strain causing an infection.

Name	Description
Streptolysin O	An exotoxin, one of the bases of the organism's beta-hemolytic property, streptolysin O causes an immune response and detection of antibodies to it; antistreptolysin O (ASO) can be clinically used to confirm a recent infection. It is damaged by oxygen.
Streptolysin S	A cardiotoxic exotoxin, another beta-hemolytic component, not immunogenic and O_{2} stable: A potent cell poison affecting many types of cell including neutrophils, platelets, and subcellular organelles.
Streptococcal pyrogenic exotoxin A (SpeA)	Superantigens secreted by many strains of S. pyogenes: This streptococcal pyrogenic exotoxin is responsible for the rash of scarlet fever and many of the symptoms of streptococcal toxic shock syndrome, also known as toxic shock like syndrome (TSLS).
Streptococcal pyrogenic exotoxin C (SpeC)	Superantigens secreted by many strains of S. pyogenes: This streptococcal pyrogenic exotoxin is responsible for the rash of scarlet fever and many of the symptoms of streptococcal toxic shock syndrome, also known as toxic shock like syndrome (TSLS).
Streptococcal pyrogenic exotoxin B (SpeB)	A cysteine protease and the predominant secreted protein. Multiple actions, including degrading the extracellular matrix, cytokines, complement components, and immunoglobulins. Also called streptopain.
Streptokinase	Enzymatically activates plasminogen, a proteolytic enzyme, into plasmin, which in turn digests fibrin and other proteins
Hyaluronidase	Hyaluronidase is widely assumed to facilitate the spread of the bacteria through tissues by breaking down hyaluronic acid, an important component of connective tissue. However, very few isolates of S. pyogenes are capable of secreting active hyaluronidase due to mutations in the gene that encodes the enzyme. Moreover, the few isolates capable of secreting hyaluronidase do not appear to need it to spread through tissues or to cause skin lesions. Thus, the true role of hyaluronidase in pathogenesis, if any, remains unknown.
Streptodornase	Most strains of S. pyogenes secrete up to four different DNases, which are sometimes called streptodornase. The DNases protect the bacteria from being trapped in neutrophil extracellular traps (NETs) by digesting the NETs' web of DNA, to which are bound neutrophil serine proteases that can kill the bacteria.
C5a peptidase	C5a peptidase cleaves a potent neutrophil chemotaxin called C5a, which is produced by the complement system. C5a peptidase is necessary to minimize the influx of neutrophils early in infection as the bacteria are attempting to colonize the host's tissue. C5a peptidase, although required to degrade the neutrophil chemotaxin C5a in the early stages of infection, is not required for S. pyogenes to prevent the influx of neutrophils as the bacteria spread through the fascia.
Streptococcal chemokine protease	The affected tissue of patients with severe cases of necrotizing fasciitis are devoid of neutrophils. The serine protease ScpC, which is released by S. pyogenes, is responsible for preventing the migration of neutrophils to the spreading infection. ScpC degrades the chemokine IL-8, which would otherwise attract neutrophils to the site of infection.

=== Genome ===
The genomes of different strains were sequenced (genome size is 1.8–1.9 Mbp), encoding about 1700-1900 proteins (1700 in strain NZ131, 1865 in strain MGAS5005). Complete genome sequences of the type strain of S. pyogenes (NCTC 8198^{T} = CCUG 4207^{T}) are available in DNA Data Bank of Japan, European Nucleotide Archive, and GenBank under the accession numbers LN831034 and CP028841.

=== Biofilm formation ===
Biofilms are a way for S. pyogenes, as well as other bacterial cells, to communicate with each other. In the biofilm gene expression for multiple purposes (such as defending against the host immune system) is controlled via quorum sensing. One of the biofilm forming pathways in GAS is the Rgg2/3 pathway. It regulates SHP's (short hydrophobic peptides) that are quorum sensing pheromones, a.k.a. autoinducers. The SHP's are translated to an immature form of the pheromone and must undergo processing, first by a metalloprotease enzyme inside the cell and then in the extracellular space, to reach their mature active form. The mode of transportation out of the cell and the extracellular processing factor(s) are still unknown. The mature SHP pheromone can then be taken into nearby cells and the cell it originated from via a transmembrane protein, oligopeptide permease. In the cytosol the pheromones have two functions in the Rgg2/3 pathway. Firstly, they inhibit the activity of Rgg3 which is a transcriptional regulator repressing SHP production. Secondly, they bind another transcriptional regulator, Rgg2, that increases the production of SHP's, having an antagonistic effect to Rgg3. SHP's activating their own transcriptional activator creates a positive feedback loop, which is common for the production for quorum sensing peptides. It enables the rapid production of the pheromones in large quantities. The production of SHP's increases biofilm biogenesis. It has been suggested that GAS switches between biofilm formation and degradation by utilizing pathways with opposing effects. Whilst Rgg2/3 pathway increases biofilm, the RopB pathway disrupts it. RopB is another Rgg-like protein (Rgg1) that directly activates SpeB (streptococcal pyrogenic exotoxin B), a cysteine protease that acts as a virulence factor. In the absence of this pathway, biofilm formation is enhanced, possibly due to the lack of the protease degrading pheromones or other Rgg2/3 pathway counteracting effects.

== Pathology ==
S. pyogenes is the cause of many human diseases, ranging from mild superficial skin infections to life-threatening systemic diseases.

When the infection is of the throat, S. pyogenes causes pharyngitis which is also known as strep throat. In rare cases, strep throat can develop into a condition known as scarlet fever. In this disease, the most striking symptom is a strawberry-like rash on the tongue.

Infections of the skin range from mild to life-threatening. Superficial infections of S. pyogenes infections include and localized skin infection non-bullous (impetigo). Erysipelas and cellulitis are characterized by multiplication and lateral spread of S. pyogenes in deep layers of the skin. S. pyogenes invasion and multiplication in the fascia beneath the skin can lead to necrotizing fasciitis, a life-threatening surgical emergency.

Colonization of the vagina by S. pyogenes can cause several illnesses, depending on the circumstances. The bacterium is a major cause of puerperal fever in the mother and infection in newborns. Newborns are susceptible to some forms of the infection that are rarely seen in adults, including meningitis. Toxins produced by S. pyogenes may lead to streptococcal toxic shock syndrome, a life-threatening emergency.

Like many pathogenic bacteria, S. pyogenes may colonize a healthy person's respiratory system without causing disease, existing as a commensal member of the respiratory microbiota. It is commonly found in some populations as part of the mixed microbiome of the upper respiratory tract. Individuals who have the bacterium in their bodies but no signs of disease are known as asymptomatic carriers. The bacteria may start to cause disease when the host's immune system weakens, such as during a viral respiratory infection, which may lead to S. pyogenes superinfection.

S. pyogenes can also cause disease in the form of post-infectious "non-pyogenic" (not associated with local bacterial multiplication and pus formation) syndromes. These autoimmune-mediated complications (sequela) follow a small percentage of infections and include rheumatic fever and acute post-infectious glomerulonephritis. Both conditions appear several weeks following the initial streptococcal infection. S. pyogenes infections are commonly associated with the release of one or more bacterial toxins. The release of endotoxins from throat infections has been linked to the development of scarlet fever which can lead to rheumatic fever. Rheumatic fever is characterized by inflammation of the joints and/or heart following an episode of streptococcal pharyngitis. Acute glomerulonephritis, inflammation of the renal glomerulus, can follow streptococcal pharyngitis or skin infection.

== Culture, biochemical, and phenotypic characteristics ==
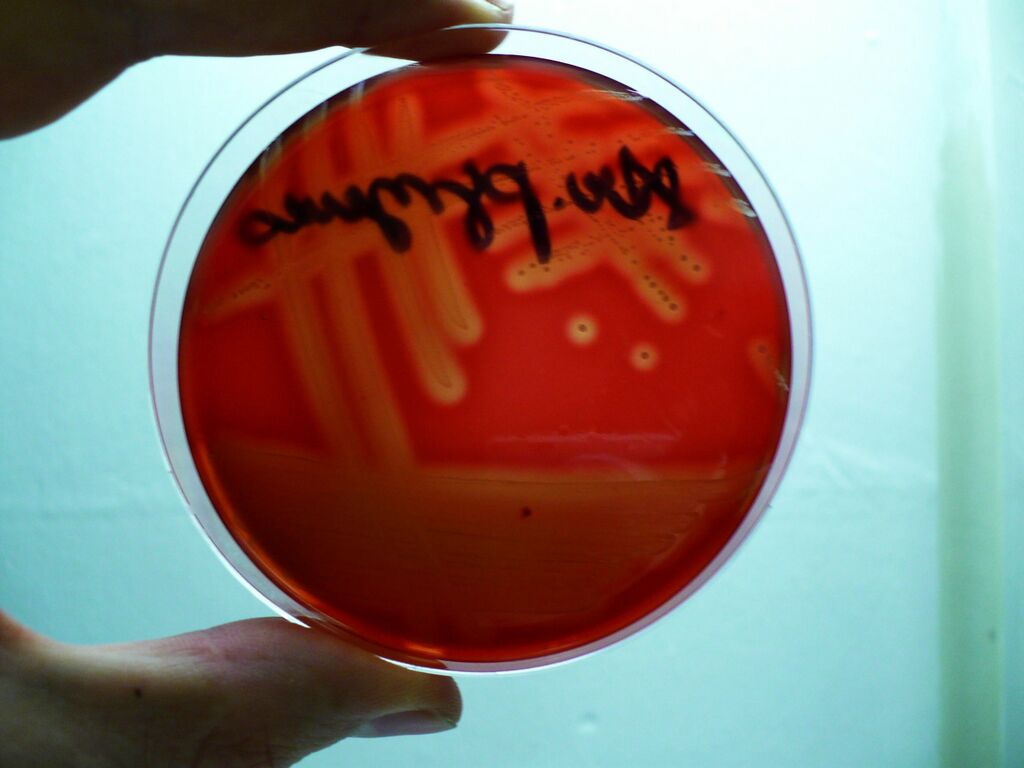
S. pyogenes demonstrating beta-hemolysis on blood agar

S. pyogenes grows grows best on enriched media, particularly 5% sheep blood agar, which supports its nutritional requirements and allows visualization of hemolysis. Colonies are typically ~0.5-1mm in size with a large zone of beta-hemolysis, the complete destruction of red blood cells. Clinical S. pyogenes cultures are often cultured anaerobically to enhance hemolysis, due to the production of streptolysin-O, a heat labile toxin.

=== Key laboratory tests ===
- Catalase test
  - Negative (distinguishes streptococci from staphylococci)
- Bacitracin sensitivity
  - Sensitive
- PYR test:
  - Positive. Differentiates GAS from morphologically similar Group B, C, and G streptococci
- Lancefield grouping
- Beta hemolysis
  - Large zone. Differentiates GAS from Anginosus group Streptococci (which sometimes have Lancefield A antigens)

== Antibiotic sensitivity ==
S. pyogenes is sensitive to penicillin, and has not developed resistance to it, making penicillin a suitable antibiotic to treat infections caused by this bacterium. Failure of treatment with penicillin is generally attributed to other local commensal microorganisms producing β-lactamase, or failure to achieve adequate tissue levels in the pharynx. Certain strains have developed resistance to macrolides, tetracyclines, and clindamycin.

== Vaccine ==
There is a polyvalent inactivated vaccine against several types of Streptococcus including S. pyogenes called "vacuna antipiogena polivalente BIOL". It is recommended to be administered in a 5 week series. Two weekly applications are made at intervals of 2 to 4 days. The vaccine is produced by the Instituto Biológico Argentino.

There is another potential vaccine being developed; the vaccine candidate peptide is called StreptInCor.

== Applications ==
=== Bionanotechnology ===
Many S. pyogenes proteins have unique properties, which have been harnessed in recent years to produce a highly specific "superglue" and a route to enhance the effectiveness of antibody therapy.

=== Genome editing ===
The CRISPR system from this organism that is used to recognize and destroy DNA from invading viruses, thus stopping the infection, was appropriated in 2012 for use as a genome-editing tool that could potentially alter any piece of DNA and later RNA.

== See also ==
- Friedrich Fehleisen
- Friedrich Julius Rosenbach
- Friedrich Loeffler
- Frederick Twort
- William Coley
