= T12 =

T12 may refer to:

== Aerospace ==
- T12 (satellite), part of the DirecTV satellite fleet
- Slingsby T.12 Gull, a British glider
- Soyuz T-12, a crewed spaceflight
- Sukhoi T-12 Shturmovik-90, a proposed Russian fighter aircraft

== Anatomy and medicine ==
- Bacteriophage T12, responsible for scarlet fever
- Thoracic spinal nerve 12
- Twelfth thoracic vertebra

== Automobiles ==
- Cooper T12, a racing car
- Dallara T12, a racing car
- Isotta Fraschini T12, a concept car

== Rail and transit ==
=== Lines ===
- Île-de-France tramway Line 12 Express

=== Locomotives ===
- Prussian T 12, a steam locomotive
- DRGW Class T-12, an American 3ft steam locomotive; see Rio Grande 168

=== Stations ===
- Gokiso Station, Nagoya, Aichi Prefecture, Japan
- Higashi-Sapporo Station, Sapporo, Hokkaido, Japan
- Kyoto Shiyakusho-mae Station, Kyoto, Japan
- Monzen-Nakachō Station, Tokyo, Japan
- Moriguchi Station (Osaka), Japan
- Sambommatsu Station (Kagawa), Japan

== Weapons and armor ==
- 100 mm anti-tank gun T-12, a Soviet anti-tank gun
- T-12 Cloudmaker, an earthquake bomb
- T-12 sniper rifle, a Turkish rifle
- T-12 tank, a Soviet prototype tank

== Other uses ==
- T12 (classification), a disability sport classification
- Circular Head language
- Estonian national road 12
- T12 road (Tanzania)
- German torpedo boat T12
- HMT Amethyst (T12), a trawler of the Royal Navy
- T12 lamp, a fluorescent lamp format
