= Streptococcal pyrogenic exotoxin =

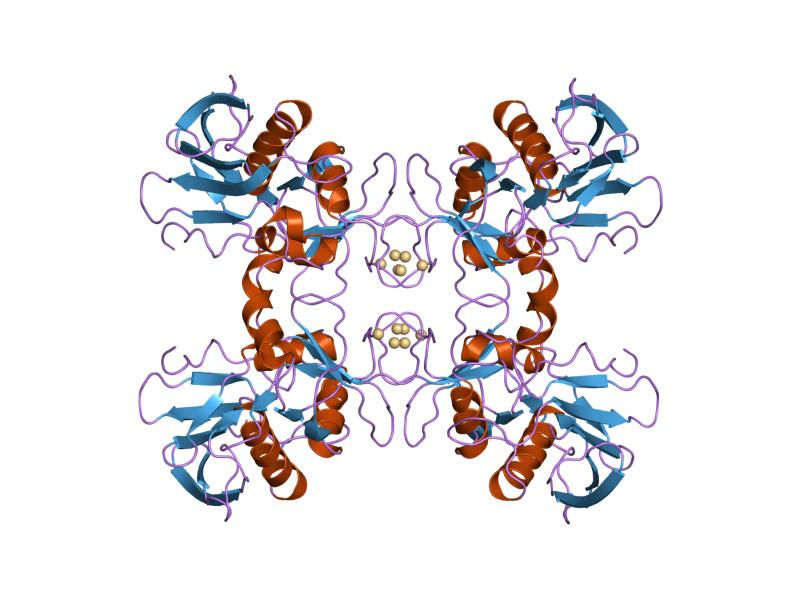
Cartoon representation of the molecular structure of SpeA1.

Streptococcal pyrogenic exotoxins also known as erythrogenic toxins, are exotoxins secreted by strains of the bacterial species Streptococcus pyogenes. SpeA and SpeC are superantigens, which induce inflammation by nonspecifically activating T cells and stimulating the production of inflammatory cytokines. SpeB, the most abundant streptococcal extracellular protein, is a cysteine protease. Pyrogenic exotoxins are implicated as the causative agent of scarlet fever and streptococcal toxic shock syndrome. There is no consensus on the exact number of pyrogenic exotoxins. Serotypes A, B, and C are the most extensively studied and recognized by all sources, but others note up to thirteen distinct types, categorizing SpeF through SpeM as additional superantigens. Erythrogenic toxins are known to damage the plasma membranes of blood capillaries under the skin and produce a red skin rash (characteristic of scarlet fever). Past studies have shown that multiple variants of erythrogenic toxins may be produced, depending on the strain of S. pyogenes in question. Some strains may not produce a detectable toxin at all. Bacteriophage T12 infection of S. pyogenes enables the production of SpeA, and increases virulence.

== History ==
=== Discovery and nomenclature ===
SpeB was identified in 1919 as an ectoenzyme secreted by certain strains of streptococci. It was originally studied as two separate toxins, streptococcal pyrogenic exotoxin B and streptococcal cysteine proteinase, until it was shown that both proteins were encoded by the speB gene and that the attributed pyrogenic activities were due to contamination by SpeA and SpeC.

Pyrogenic, in streptococcal pyrogenic exotoxin, means "causes fever." Erythrogenic refers to the typical red rash of scarlet fever. In older literature, these toxins are also referred to as scarlatina toxins or scarlet fever toxins due to their role as the causative agents of the disease.

SpeB is known as streptococcal pyrogenic exotoxin B, streptopain and streptococcal cysteine proteinase as a result of its original misidentification as two separate toxins, and is neither an exotoxin nor pyrogenic.

== Structure ==
=== Location of genes ===
The speB and speJ genes are located in the core bacterial chromosome of all strains of S. pyogenes. However, despite its presence and high levels of conservation in the nucleotide sequence, 25–40% of these strains do not express the SpeB toxin in significant amounts.

In contrast, speA, speC and speH-M are encoded within prophages, bacteriophage genomes that have integrated into the chromosome of the host bacterium genome.

There is a lack of consensus over the location of the speG gene, which has been attributed to both the core chromosome and lysogenic phages.

=== Protein structure ===
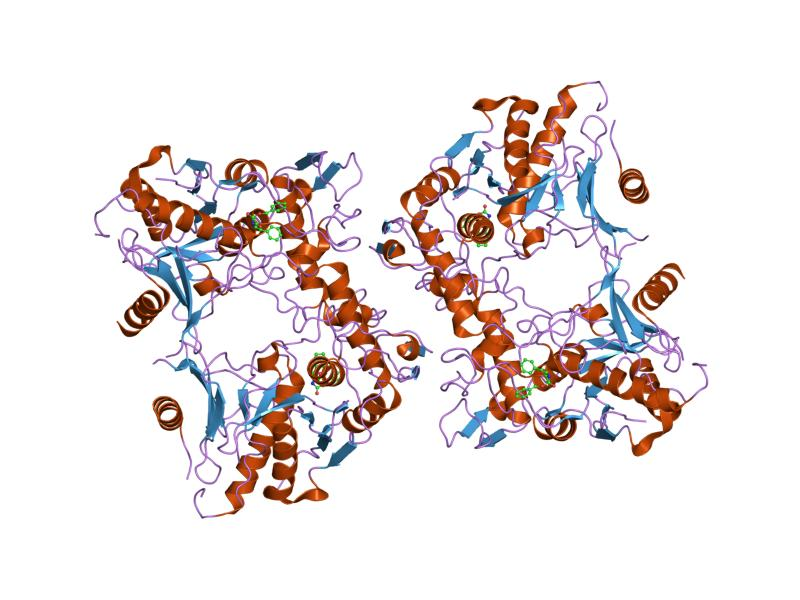
Structure of SpeB.

SpeB is a 28 kDa protein with three major forms, mSpeB1, mSpeB2 and mSpeB3, which are categorized by variations the primary amino acid sequence. Three amino acids, C192, H340, and W357, are vital for enzymatic activity in all variants. The toxin contains a canonical papain-like domain, and mSpeB2 has an additional human integrin binding domain.

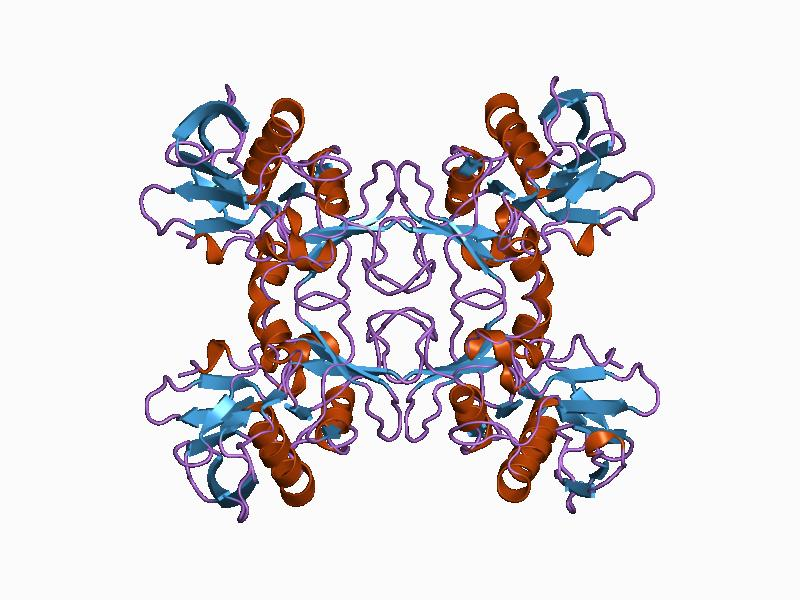
Structure of SpeA1.

All superantigenic streptococcal pyrogenic exotoxins contain two major conserved protein domains that are linked by an α-helix, which consist of an amino-terminal oligosaccharide/oligonucleotide binding fold and a carboxy-terminal β-grasp domain, as well as a dodecapeptide binding region. SpeA also has a cystine loop, a low-affinity α-chain MHC II binding site, and the Vβ-TCR binding site. SpeC, SpeG, SpeH and SpeJ contains a Zn^{2+}-dependent high β-chain MHC II binding site in addition to the low affinity site present in SpeA, and lacks the cystine loop. SpeH also has an additional α3-β8 loop that mediates the specificity of the toxin's Vβ-TCR binding site.

=== Processing and regulation ===
The speB gene encodes for an amino acid sequence that becomes the 40 kDa zymogen, known as SpeBz, after cleavage of the signal sequence. SpeBz undergoes autocatalysis through at least eight intermediates to create the 28 kDa SpeBm. Finally cystine-192 and histidine-340 form a catalytic dyad. Each step is tightly regulated by multiple factors, allowing sophisticated temporal expression of the mature proteinase.

== Mechanisms of action ==
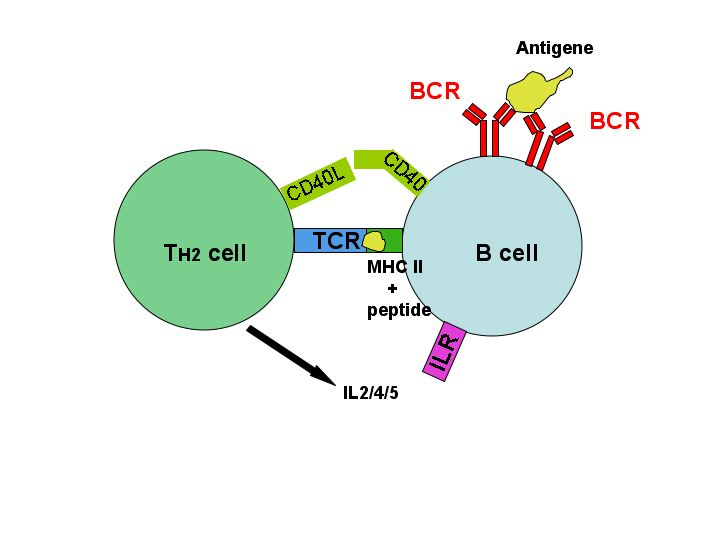
T-cell dependent b-cell activation, showing TH2-cell (left) B-cell (right) and several interaction molecules.

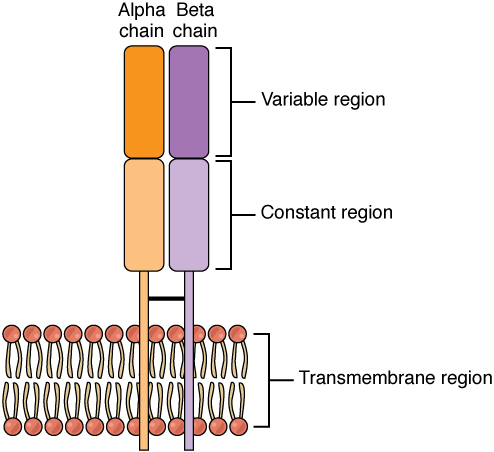
T-cell receptor.

=== SpeA and SpeC ===
SpeA and SpeC bind to MHC Class II molecules, are presented to T cells, and bind to the variable region of the beta chain of T-cell receptors (TCRs). Once activated, the T cells release pro-inflammatory cytokines and chemokines. The interactions with TCRs are characterized by low affinities and fast dissociation, allowing the toxin to activate multiple T cells in succession. The lack of specificity allow the activation of up to 50% of the T cells in the body.

=== SpeB ===
SpeB cleaves degrades multiple proteins through hydrolysis, including cytokines, extracellular matrix proteins and immunoglobulin. It requires three amino acids before the cleavage site, known as P1, P2 and P3. Of these, SpeB has a preference for hydrophobic P2 and positively charged P1 residues, with greater importance of the P2 amino acid.

== Roles in virulence, pathogenesis and infection ==
=== SpeB ===
Streptococcal cysteine proteinase has roles in immune evasion and apoptosis, as well as potential influence on bacterial internalization. There is contradictory evidence regarding the effect of SpeB on virulence. Some studies have reported increased protease levels in strains that cause scarlet fever in comparison to those associated with streptococcal toxic shock syndrome, while others show decreased expression in more virulent strains.

SpeB degrades immunoglobulins and cytokines, as well as through cleavage of C3b, inhibiting recruitment of phagocytic cells and the complement activation pathway. This results in decreased inflammation and neutrophil levels around the site of infection, preventing clearance and through phagocytosis and promoting the survival of S. pyogenes.

The toxin also induces apoptosis in host cells after GAS internalization. Evidence suggests that this may take place through extrinsic and intrinsic caspase pathways. The receptor-binding pathway and Fas-mediated apoptotic signaling pathway have been implicated in this process. The induction of apoptosis results in necrotizing fasciitis.
