= Streptopain =

Enzyme found in Streptococcus

Identifiers
- EC no.: 3.4.22.10
- CAS no.: 9025-51-8

Databases
- IntEnz: IntEnz view
- BRENDA: BRENDA entry
- ExPASy: NiceZyme view
- KEGG: KEGG entry
- MetaCyc: metabolic pathway
- PRIAM: profile
- PDB structures: RCSB PDB PDBe PDBsum
Search
- PMC: articles
- PubMed: articles
- NCBI: proteins

Streptopain, also known as streptococcal pyrogenic exotoxin B (SpeB) is a streptococcal cysteine protease. Other names include Streptococcus peptidase A, Streptococcus protease, and streptococcal cysteine proteinase. Streptopain catalyses the following chemical reaction

Preferential cleavage with hydrophobic residues at P2, P1 and P1'

It is isolated from the group A bacterium Streptococcus pyogenes and acts as a virulence factor.

== See also ==
- RopB transcriptional regulator
