= Antibody therapy =

Antibody therapy may refer to several different uses of antibodies for the treatment of medical conditions.

- Monoclonal antibody therapy
- Oligoclonal antibody therapy e.g. MM-151
- Antiserum
- Intravenous immunoglobulin
