= Lancefield grouping =

System for classifying streptococci bacteria

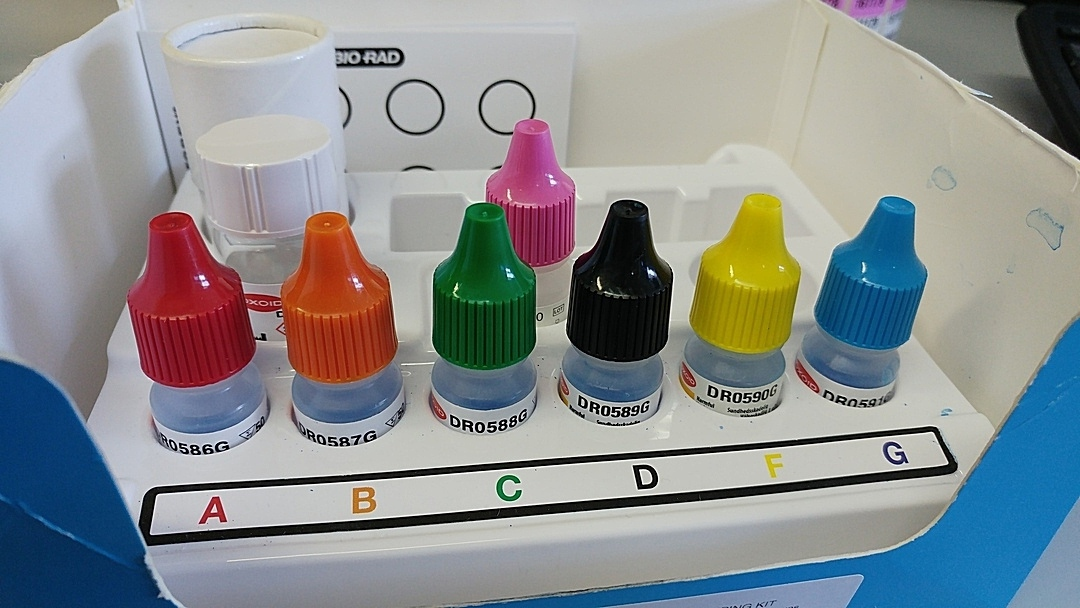
Reagents used for Lancefield grouping

Lancefield grouping is a system of classification that classifies catalase-negative Gram-positive cocci based on the carbohydrate composition of bacterial antigens found on their cell walls. The system, created by Rebecca Lancefield, was historically used to organize the various members of the family Streptococcaceae, which includes the genera Lactococcus and Streptococcus, but now is largely superfluous due to explosive growth in the number of streptococcal species identified since the 1970s. However, it has retained some clinical usefulness even after the taxonomic changes, and as of 2018, Lancefield designations are still often used to communicate medical microbiological test results.

The classification assigns a letter code to each serotype. There are 20 described serotypes assigned the letters A to V (excluding E, I and J). Bacteria of the genus Enterococcus, formerly known as group D streptococci, were classified as members of the genus Streptococcus until 1984 and are included in the original Lancefield grouping. Many—but not all—species of streptococcus are hemolytic. Notably, enterococci and Streptococcus bovis (Lancefield group D) are not beta-hemolytic. Though there are many groups of streptococci, the principal organisms that are known to cause human disease belong to group A (Streptococcus pyogenes), group B (Streptococcus agalactiae), group C/G (Streptococcus dysgalactiae) both members of group D (Streptococcus gallolyticus and Streptococcus infantarius, both members of the Streptococcus bovis group), and two alpha-haemolytic groups that lack the Lancefield carbohydrate antigen: Streptococcus pneumoniae and viridans streptococci.

== Classification ==
- Group A - Streptococcus pyogenes
- Group B - Streptococcus agalactiae
- Group C - Streptococcus equisimilis, Streptococcus equi, Streptococcus zooepidemicus, Streptococcus dysgalactiae
- Group D - Enterococcus faecalis, Enterococcus faecium, Enterococcus durans and Streptococcus bovis
- Group F, G & L - Streptococcus anginosus
- Group G - Streptococcus dysgalactiae
- Group H - Streptococcus sanguis
- Group K - Streptococcus salivarius
- Group L - Streptococcus dysgalactiae
- Group M & O - Streptococcus mitis
- Group N - Lactococcus lactis
- Group R & S - Streptococcus suis

Other Streptococcus species are classified as 'non-Lancefield streptococci'.
