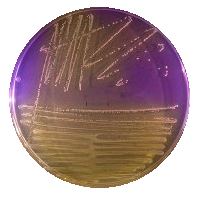
- Bacterial colony of Streptococcus canis

Scientific classification
- Domain: Bacteria
- Kingdom: Bacillati
- Phylum: Bacillota
- Class: Bacilli
- Order: Lactobacillales
- Family: Streptococcaceae
- Genus: Streptococcus
- Species: S. canis

Binomial name
- Streptococcus canis Devriese et al. 1986

= Streptococcus canis =

Species of bacterium

Streptococcus canis is a group G beta-hemolytic species of Streptococcus. It was first isolated in dogs, giving the bacterium its name. These bacteria are characteristically different from Streptococcus dysgalactiae, which is a human-specific group G species that has a different phenotypic chemical composition. S. canis is important to the skin and mucosal health of cats and dogs, but under certain circumstances, these bacteria can cause opportunistic infections. These infections were known to afflict dogs and cats prior to the formal description of the species in Devriese et al., 1986. However, additional studies revealed cases of infection in other mammal species, including cattle and even humans. Instances of mortality from S. canis in humans are very low with only a few reported cases, while actual instances of infection may be underreported due to mischaracterizations of the bacteria as S. dysgalactiae. This species, in general, is highly susceptible to antibiotics, and plans to develop a vaccine to prevent human infections are currently being considered.

The four serogroups of hemolytic streptococci identified in domesticated dogs belong to Lancefield groups A, C, E, and G. Of these four, S. canis is described as belonging to group G due to it being a beta-hemolytic and aesculin-negative Streptococcus that is able to ferment lactose. These bacteria are known to be part of the natural flora of the respiratory tract of cats and dogs. This bacterium was originally isolated from dogs, and has been differentiated from S. dysgalactiae, which is the group G Streptococus of human origin. S. canis is known to infect a variety of mammal species, including dogs, cats, mink, mice, rabbits, foxes, cattle, and even humans.

Activity or production	Human strains (S. dysgalactiae)	Animal strains (S. canis)
Hyaluronidase	+	–
Fibrinolysin	+	–
α-Galactosidase	–	+
β-Galactosidase	–	+
β-Glucuronidase	+	–
Acid produced from trehalose	+	–
Acid produced from lactose	+/-	+
Methyl-D-glucopyranoside	+/-	+

== Bacterial infections ==
=== Infections in cats and dogs ===
S. canis is considered to be an important part of the healthy microbiota of cats and dogs, promoting skin and mucosal health. However, despite these benefits under certain circumstances, strains of this bacterium have been reported to cause diseases in a variety of mammals. When opportunistic infection does occur, treatment with antibiotics is very successful at clearing the disease and preventing mortality due to the low levels of resistance in this species. During infection, the bacteria have been known to cause neonatal sepsis, abortion, and cellulitis in dogs. In addition, S. canis is also responsible for streptococcal toxic shock syndrome (STSS) and necrotizing fasciitis (NF). However, it has been contested if STSS and NF are caused solely by S. canis infection or if it is induced from the treatment of dogs with fluoroquinolone during the infection. In other mammals, the pathogen can cause lymphadenitis, arthritis, fever, mastitis, wound infections, and other conditions that vary depending on the host species. The possibility of an outbreak increases for animals that are very young, very old, confined to a densely populated area, or remain confined for long periods of time. Multiple fatal outbreaks have been reported among shelter cats due to the susceptibility of many of the cats and the close proximity of individuals within a shelter. The development of disease can occur rapidly, and symptoms in cats include skin ulceration, chronic respiratory infection, and necrotizing sinusitis. The persistence and spread of these bacteria in a confined area can lead to both sepsis and death, quickly resulting in extremely high levels of mortality among susceptible cats. Similar instances have been reported for dogs; however, the levels of mortality were considerably lower.

"Up to 70–100% of young queens in breeding catteries may carry this bacterium in the vagina, resulting in infection of the kittens, but also in the transfer of passive immunity against S. canis via colostrum."

=== Vaccine ===
"Though attempts have been made, there are no S. zooepidemicus vaccines available for any species."

=== Infections in cattle ===
Occurrences of group G Streptococcus in animals are mostly associated with S. canis, which normally infects domesticated dogs and cats. However, the pathogen can be horizontally transferred to other domesticated animals from either of these two animals. A documented instance of this transfer occurred on a central New York farm between a cat which was exhibiting chronic sinusitis and a dairy cow. This transfer resulted in S. canis mastitis on the udder of the cow, which appeared to be normal, leading to a prolonged diagnosis. Additional horizontal disease transfer to other cows in the herd was facilitated due to poor udder health management procedures, which included the use of a common cloth to wipe the udders of the cows following milking and the failure to use disinfection techniques. An outbreak of S. canis mastitis occurred from these transfers, but was controlled using antibiotic treatments and prevention techniques. Not limited to strains within the United States, instances of bovine mastitis due to S. canis have been reported in other areas. In both Germany and Israel, similar outbreaks occurred due to horizontal disease transfer from either a domesticated cat or dog, but during the Israel outbreak, the cows were clinically examined to determine the susceptibility of the pathogen to various antibiotics. From this study, the bacteria were found to be sensitive to cephalothin and partially resistant to penicillin.

=== Human infection ===
The occurrence of S. canis was thought for years to be limited to cats and dogs with rare instances of infection in cattle and other animals. However, it has been reported to form complexes with human albumin through the formation of binding sites. This ability to bind albumin in humans, in addition to the previously studied binding ability in domesticated animals, provided strong experimental evidence that the disease could be vertically transferred to humans. Medical cases support that humans under certain circumstances can become infected. Such infections may have gone undiscovered in the past due to difficulties in characterizing the biochemical makeup of this pathogen compared to the known human-infecting species such as S. dysgalactiae. An elderly man who owned a dog was admitted to the hospital after exhibiting malaise, fever, and tachycardia, and treated with antibiotics until he recovered. Varicose ulcers present on his legs were later determined to be the points of entry for the disease, transferred from his dog, thus led to his symptoms. In another case of human infection, an elderly woman was initially admitted to the hospital after slight bruising of her eyebrow, and readmitted a few days later with a high fever. Medical analysis determined her fever was the result of meningitis and sepsis that ultimately led to the death of the patient after antibiotics failed. Additional support for the possibility of S. canis infections in humans has been provided by multiple cases linking the occurrence of the disease to dog ownership in elderly men. In these cases, all men had a history of ulcers on their lower limbs, which acted as an entry point for the transmission of bacteria from the respiratory tract of the dogs. This history, in combination with continued exposure from household dogs, led to the transfer of the disease and the expression of symptoms that required medical attention.

=== Vaccine development ===
Analysis of the genomic library of S. canis led to the identification of a new streptococcal protective antigen (SPA) associated with the bacteria. This SPA may be an important component of a vaccine to prevent future infections, based on successful applications of an antiserum in a mouse model.

VetBact
