= Monokine =

Type of cytokine produced primarily by monocytes and macrophages

A monokine is a type of cytokine produced primarily by monocytes and macrophages.

Some monokines are:

- interleukin 1
- tumor necrosis factor-alpha
- alpha and beta interferon
- colony stimulating factors

== Functions ==
Monokines released from macrophages can attract neutrophils, via the process chemotaxis.

The secretion of monokine, prompted by interferon gamma, has activity for the receptors found within immune cells, such as T-cells, hindering their ability to function as regulators of the body. Thus, promoting tumor progression in the cancer-state. In fact, its activity is important in other diseases, such as pulmonary tuberculosis, where researchers have identified monokine as a biomarker.

== See also ==
- Lymphokine
