= M protein (Streptococcus) =

Gram_pos_anchor

Identifiers
- Symbol: Gram_pos_anchor
- Pfam: PF00746
- Pfam clan: CL0501
- InterPro: IPR019948
- PROSITE: PDOC00373
Available protein structures:
- PDB: IPR019948 PF00746 (ECOD; PDBsum)
- AlphaFold: IPR019948; PF00746

M protein is a virulence factor that is produced by certain species of Streptococcus. The protein plays an important role in adhesion to and colonization of host tissues and especially in evading phagocytosis by immune cells.

The protein was originally identified by Rebecca Lancefield, who also formulated the Lancefield classification system for streptococcal bacteria.

== Structure ==
The M protein is a fibrous protein that projects from the surface of bacterial cells, forming hair-like fibers that are visible under electron microscopy. Each M protein fiber consists of two polypeptide chains in α-helical secondary structure, wound together in a coiled coil. The chains are anchored in the cell membrane at their C-termini, and the C-terminal ~150 residues are embedded in the cell wall. The remainder of the protein, except for 11 residues at the N-terminus, consists of repeat sequences that stabilize the coiled coil by hydrophobic interactions.

The N-terminal ~50 amino acids of the protein, termed the hypervariable region, are extremely variable in sequence and account for the high variation in antigenicity of Streptococcus strains. This region binds and recruits the C4b-binding protein C4BP and the complement regulator Factor H, which inhibit C3 convertase, thus preventing opsonization of the bacterium so that it can evade attack by phagocytic cells.

== Vaccines and therapeutics ==
M protein is the major antigen being targeted for the development of vaccines against Group A Streptococcus (GAS). In addition to its role in infection and evasion of immune cells, M protein shares certain epitopes with proteins such as myosin and some kidney proteoglycans. An immune reaction to these epitopes is thought to partly underlie GAS-associated sequelae such as rheumatic heart disease and acute post-streptococcal glomerulonephritis. An M-protein vaccine may therefore confer resistance to both GAS infection and to these and other chronic diseases caused by antibodies against M protein cross-reacting with host antigens.

Vaccines directed against the M protein have been explored since the 1960s, but have met little success as antibody reactions leading to opsonization of the bacterium are typically directed against the hypervariable region, which varies greatly from one strain to another and would thus not produce broad-spectrum immunity. Multivalent vaccines, and vaccines targeting the conserved repeat region of M protein, are therefore being explored. However, only vaccines against the N-terminal hypervariable region have been explored in clinical trials.

M protein may also be used as the basis for immune therapy against invasive streptococcal disease and streptococcal toxic shock syndrome. Antibodies against a segment of the conserved portion of the protein have been used in mouse models to experimentally resolve these diseases, in a manner that is largely strain-independent.
