= Streptococcus bovis =

Streptococcus bovis group

Scientific classification
- Domain: Bacteria
- Phylum: Bacillota
- Class: Bacilli
- Order: Lactobacillales
- Family: Streptococcaceae
- Genus: Streptococcus

Streptococcus bovis is a historical name applied to bacteria subsequently classified into several species and subspecies within the Streptococcus bovis/Streptococcus equinus complex, or the SBSEC. The eight members of this complex are closely related Gram-positive bacteria.

Members of this complex are catalase-negative, Gram-positive cocci with spherical or ovoid cells arranged in pairs or chains. Their similar biochemical characteristics make species and subspecies difficult to distinguish using biochemical tests alone, so updated testing such as MALDI-TOF mass spectrometry is now used to differentiate them.

SBSEC species are commonly found in the alimentary tract of cattle, sheep, and other ruminants, and may cause ruminal acidosis. Animal reservoirs and geographical distributions differ among species.

In humans, members of the complex are associated with urinary tract infections, bacteremia, infective endocarditis, and occasionally sepsis. Streptococcus gallolyticus subsp. gallolyticus bloodstream infections are also associated with colorectal cancer.

== Taxonomy and nomenclature ==
=== Historical use ===
Streptococcus bovis was first described in 1919 by Sigurd Orla-Jensen. In the 1970s, it was studied as an individual species and became a focus of research due to its link to endocarditis. Organisms identified as S. bovis were divided into biotypes based on biochemical characteristics until taxonomical revisions began in the late 1990s. These biotypes were not identified as genetically heterogeneous until 1984, when DNA-DNA hybridization provided evidence the differences were not solely functional, which was the basis for later changes. However, the previous naming system persisted within some studies in the early 2000s. Subsequent taxonomic investigations supported the classification of organisms previously identified as S. bovis into distinct species and subspecies. In 2003, researchers described S. gallolyticus subsp. gallolyticus, S. gallolyticus subsp. macedonicus, and S. gallolyticus subsp. pasteurianus.

Biotype I was distinguished by the ability to ferment mannitol. Those that were mannitol-negative were separated into the Biotype II classification. Biotype II was further divided based on β-glucuronidase activity, with Biotype II/1 negative for this enzyme and Biotype II/2 positive. Growth on bile-esculin agar was also examined during biochemical characterization, with growth varying among the isolates studied and therefore limiting identification based solely on these characteristics.

S. bovis Biotypes and their Updated SBSEC Classification
Original S. bovis Biotype	Current species or subspecies
Biotype I	S. gallolyticus subsp. gallolyticus (Sgg)
Biotype II/1	S. infantarius subsp. infantarius (Sii) and S. lutetiensis
Biotype II/2	S. gallolyticus subsp. pasteurianus (SGSP)

=== Streptococcus bovis/Streptococcus equinus complex (SBSEC) ===
When referencing S. bovis in current research, the term is often used within the Streptococcus bovis/Streptococcus equinus complex (SBSEC). The SBSEC contains subspecies that were once classified as S. bovis, along with other closely related species. S. ruminicola was described in 2022 following its isolation from the rumens of cattle and goats.

Species & subspecies of the SBSEC
S. equinus
S. gallolyticus subsp. gallolyticus (Sgg)
S. gallolyticus subsp. pasteurianus (SGSP)
S. gallolyticus subsp. macedonicus
S. infantarius subsp. infantarius (Sii)
S. lutetiensis
S. alactolyticus
S. ruminicola

Despite taxonomic changes distinguishing species and subspecies within the SBSEC, S. bovis is still used in clinical practice. Identification to the subspecies level is important for understanding intricate connections to clinical conditions, but the frequent taxonomic changes have made it difficult for clinicians to follow the appropriate terminology. Additionally, there are ongoing developments in identifying individual species and subspecies. Thus, S. bovis is still sometimes used as an umbrella designation for the SBSEC in clinical literature given its strong historical association with colorectal cancer (CRC).

== Microbiology of the SBSEC ==
=== Morphology and cellular characteristics ===
The Streptococcus bovis/Streptococcus equinus complex (SBSEC) consists of nonenterococcal streptococci historically associated with Lancefield group D. Members of this group have thick peptidoglycan cell walls containing teichoic acids and no outer membrane. Their spherical or ovoid-shaped cell chains divide along successive parallel planes. They are nonmotile, lack flagella, and do not form endospores. Surface structures vary among members, with some strains producing a capsule and pilus types differing among species and subspecies.

SBSEC organisms are facultative anaerobes. They grow optimally at temperatures between 20°C and 45°C with growth completely halting at extremes of 10°C and 50°C. They obtain energy primarily through carbohydrate fermentation, with ruminal species producing lactic acid as a major metabolic end product. As catalase-negative microbes, they lack detectable catalase activity in biochemical tests. Organisms grow in bile-esculin medium containing 4% oxgall, equivalent to 40% bile salts. Members are typically intolerant to 6.5% NaCl solutions, with the exception of S. ruminicola.

=== Biochemical identification ===
The original group D streptococci studied by Lancefield were isolated from cheese and placed into Lancefield group D based on their antigenic characteristics. Members of the SBSEC are small-colony and are not detected on commonly used screening methods, making them historically biochemically challenging to differentiate. The original identification and classification were based solely on shared morphological and biochemical characteristics, and researchers developed new identification methods, such as the Rapid ID 32 strep system, in order to accurately diagnose animals and humans infected with the bacteria.

To differentiate between the species and subspecies, several methods are used. S. gallolyticus subsp. gallolyticus (Sgg) ferments mannitol, whereas S. infantarius subsp. infantarius (Sii) and S. gallolyticus subsp. pasteurianus (SGSP) do not, so the presence of mannitol can be used to differentiate them. SGSP demonstrates α- and β-galactosidase enzymic activity, whereas Sgg typically does not. β-glucuronidase enzyme activity can also be used to differentiate as most SGSP strains test positive while Sgg tests negative. Starch fermentation is another method for differentiating between the subtypes because Sgg tests positive while most SGSP strains test negative. For faster and reliable identification, MALDI-TOF mass spectrometry can be used.

Habitats, colonization, and infection associated with the Streptococcus bovis/Streptococcus equinus complex. Numbers refer to sections of the original published review.

== Ecology and natural habitat ==
Streptococcus bovis/Streptococcus equinus complex bacteria are present in the gastrointestinal tracts of humans and animals, as well as in fermented foods. Their individual ecological characteristics are distinct, which contributes to their unique habitats and relationships within host organisms.

=== Human GI tract ===
SBSEC organisms colonize in the intestinal microbiota of healthy individuals asymptomatically, without causing notable symptoms or disease. Reported carriage frequencies vary with each population examined, specimen type, identification method, and species included, complicating comparisons between studies. Consequently, historical estimates based on cultures identified generally as S. bovis are not directly comparable with modern studies targeting individual species or subspecies. Intestinal carriage should be distinguished from invasive infection.

In the microbiome of the gut, interactions with other intestinal microorganisms influence colonization. Experimental studies have shown the Sgg strain UCN34 produces gallocin, a bacteriocin known to inhibit competing enterococci.

=== Animal reservoirs ===
Rumen act as a reservoir for the SBSEC, which participate in carbohydrate fermentation in ruminants, namely cows and goats. Their growth and metabolic activity are influenced by their population's nutritional availability and feed composition. Increases in fermentable carbohydrates promote bacterial growth and acid production, contributing to ruminal acidosis. Historical ruminal samples and isolates described as S. bovis require reevaluation under current taxonomic clarifications. For example, S. ruminicola was found in Korean domestic ruminants as a species distinct from other members.

SBSEC organisms have also been recovered from poultry, pigs, household pets, and wildlife. SGSP has been identified in pigeon digestive tracts, and Sgg has been identified in turkey feces. Shared sequence types between human and animal isolates, along with associations between human carriage and animal contact, support the possibility of transmission between these hosts. However, these observations do not establish the frequency or direction of zoonotic transmission.

=== Geographical distinctions ===
Regional differences in SBSEC ecology include associations with traditional fermented foods showing noticeable differences between Europe, West Africa, East Africa, and East Asia. Studies of Sii have established its occurrence in fermented dairy products in East and West Africa. Research has distinguished a major dairy-associated lineage from some human-associated lineages, although ecological groups are not completely separate. These findings indicate species identification alone does not establish the pathogenic potential of an organism.

Conversely, dairy origin also does not indicate safety for human consumption or probiotic use. An experimental investigation of two dairy-derived Sii strains evaluated both potentially beneficial characteristics and virulence-related conditions. The researchers concluded that both strains showed enough risk to be considered unsafe for human or animal application. However, this conclusion applies to only these specific strains rather than establishing identical properties across all members. Some medical application may become derived from these strands of the SBSEC in the future, though currently they are wildly associated with clinical diagnostics and disease prediction.

The distribution of organisms in clinical collections varies across general study settings. In Hiroshima, Japan, SGSP accounted for 29 of 39 bloodstream isolates, whereas Sgg accounted for 5. A German investigation of 58 bloodstream isolates identified 29 as Sgg, 12 as SGSP, and 17 as S. lutetiensis. These findings describe specific regional collections and do not reflect the national intestinal carriage rates. Differences in laboratory identification further complicate comparisons between studies, though all together can provide a rough idea of prevalence across certain countries.

== Human infection ==
Organisms historically identified as S. bovis have been implicated in several different human infections, including bacteremia, infective endocarditis, and biliary tract infections. In clinical settings, members are not always individually identified in routine testing, as identification methods differ in their ability to distinguish these closely related organisms. However, recent advancements in MALDI-TOF MS libraries have made subspecies identification more practical and support research on the individual infection routes and disease implications of SBSEC members.

Recent studies use individual species and subspecies identification when discussing bacteremia and infective endocarditis, rather than the general grouping of the SBSEC. Previous clinical reports have identified S. bovis members as causative agents of endocarditis, urinary tract infections, sepsis, and neonatal meningitis. Maternal bacteremia with intraamniotic infection and fetal death has also been reported. Individual case reports have identified S. alactolyticus as a cause of bacteremia and infective endocarditis.

Subspecies and their Clinical Associations**
Subspecies	Clinical Association
S. gallolyticus subsp. gallolyticus (Sgg)	Strong association with colorectal cancer Also associated with: Bacteremia; Infective endocarditis; Biliary tract infections
S. gallolyticus subsp. pasteurianus (SGSP)	Cause of bacteremia. Also associated with: Adult and neonatal bacterial meningitis; Infective endocarditis; Biliary tract infections; Other malignancies observed in affected patients; Weaker association with colorectal cancer
S. lutetiensis	Associated with: Bacteremia; Infective endocarditis; Biliary tract infections; Observed with pancreatic cancer; Reported neonatal meningitis
S. infantarius subsp. infantarius (Sii)	Associated with: Bacteremia; Association with colorectal polyps; Observed with colorectal and pancreatic cancer

**Not all subspecies are included within this chart, as more recently discovered species have few or weak clinical associations in current research.

== Biotype I: S. gallolyticus subsp. gallolyticus (Sgg) ==
Scanning electron micrograph of Streptococcus gallolyticus subsp. gallolyticus strain UCN34, formerly classified as S. bovis biotype I.

=== Morphology and cellular characteristics ===
Like other microbes within the SBSEC, S. gallolyticus subsp. gallolyticus (Sgg) is a Gram-positive, non-motile, non-spore-forming streptococcus with a thick cell wall containing peptidoglycan and teichoic acid. The presence of a polysaccharide capsule protects Sgg from the innate immune system.

Sgg contains three pilus operons that are linked to encoding pili: pil1, pil2, and pil3, as identified in strain UCN34. pil1 allows Sgg to bind to collagen and factor XII, which contributes to the virulence of this subspecies. Sgg also has the ability to form biofilms, which protect it from conditions within the host's body. Despite being a Gram-positive bacterium, Sgg strain DSM 13808 produces an exopolysaccharide with a phosphate group at its reducing end, a feature also reported in polysaccharide structures of some Gram-negative bacteria.

Some Sgg strains house plasmids that are common in Gram-positive pathogens, along with a variety of other plasmids that suggest lateral transfer in the microbe. The SPAR locus is another unique feature in Sgg strain TX20005 that is directly associated with tumor promotion and cancer-cell proliferation. When SPAR was removed, the strain lost the ability to promote colon tumor development and stimulate cancer-cell proliferation.

Streptococcus gallolyticus subsp. gallolyticus shares most of its culture characteristics with other SBSEC species, but salt tolerance varies between strains. In one study, eight of 29 Sgg isolates grew in 6.5% NaCl. Sgg grows on nutrient-rich, complex media. In laboratory protocols, cultures are incubated in an atmosphere enriched with carbon dioxide. In one study, isolates were subcultured on sheep blood agar for 20–24 hours at 35°C in 5% carbon dioxide. Other research cultured the subspecies in brain-heart infusion broth at 37°C. Colonies on blood agar tend to be small, and SBSEC organisms are typically non-β-hemolytic, with α- or γ-hemolysis being reported among some members.

Sgg has developed distinct metabolic features from other SBSEC species. While some other species have evolved to have smaller genomes and have lost some features, Sgg retains pili genes and unique metabolic features. Sgg is a chemoorganoheterotroph that has the ability to utilize diverse carbohydrates from the environment. This includes carbohydrates derived from plant life, which is a feature linked to its adaptation to the rumen. The genome of Sgg strain UCN34 encodes 33 different hydrolases, which allows it to effectively break down carbohydrates. The unique metabolic function of Sgg can be attributed to extensive phosphotransferase systems, which allow sugar to be used in metabolism as it is brought into the cell.

Sgg strain UCN34 has pathways to synthesize all 20 amino acids and more vitamins than any other species within the Streptococcus genus. These metabolic features are attributed to lateral gene transfer during interactions with other bacteria in the rumen.

=== Ecology and colonization ===
Sgg often colonizes the gastrointestinal (GI) tracts of both animals and humans. Contact with contaminated dairy products, red meat, or animal excrement used as plant fertilizer has been investigated as a possible factor in human colonization. Human carriage was associated with animal contact and use of animal excrement as fertilizer, while food-related exposures showed limited associations. Specific strains of Sgg show genetic differences associated with geographic origin or host source.

=== Pathogenesis ===
Sgg is thought to have zoonotic potential through possible transfer between humans and animals. This possibility is supported by shared sequence types between human and animal isolates. Sgg is classified as opportunistic and causes endocarditis through invasion of the bloodstream and adherence to exposed collagen on heart valves. Sgg is a highly adaptive subspecies, partly attributed to its large number of regulatory genes. In strain UCN34, regulatory genes account for 7.7% of predicted genes. This proportion is comparable to other opportunistic pathogens, such as Pseudomonas aeruginosa.

Sgg binds to host collagen and fibrinogen, contributing to the pathogenicity of the subspecies. pil1 contributes to attachment to collagen-rich heart valves. pil3 contributes to binding to intestinal mucus and fibrinogen. These functions can be attributed to the pilus operons.

Capsule and biofilm formation are also features that contribute to pathogenicity. Other potential immune-evasion factors include C3-degrading protease and C5a peptidase, which were identified during genome analysis. Biofilm growth has been associated with increased antibiotic tolerance in clinical Sgg isolates. In addition, Sgg utilizes quorum-sensing to regulate the production of inhibitory substances that act against other Streptococcus species, reducing competition in the environment.

The accessory genome of Sgg contains characteristics that contribute to the microbe's ability to colonize the intestinal tract. The genome contains genes for T7SS, a protein secretion system involved in interactions with other microbes and the host. In strain TX20005, T7SS contributes to intestinal colonization and attachment to colonic epithelial cells. When T7SS was disrupted, the strain lost much of its ability to colonize the mouse colon and showed reduced tumor-promoting activity. In addition, genes encoding for bile salt hydrolase were identified as potential contributors to persistence in the intestinal tract. The accessory genome varies between strains of Sgg, and strains differ in their pathogenic potential.

=== Disease associations ===
==== Colorectal cancer ====
Sgg is the subspecies within the SBSEC that is most strongly associated with colorectal cancer. A 2025 study of clinical Sgg isolates found that 55% of the strains found in humans had some association with colorectal cancer.

The same study found that no particular feature in the genome was associated with colorectal cancer, indicating that the relationship between Sgg is complex and not caused by a particular strain or direct pathway. Sgg is known to reproduce more effectively in environments where tumors are present. Sgg also induces transcriptional reprogramming of genes associated with cancer in cultured human colon cells, suggesting a potential contribution to tumor development. A bidirectional relationship between colorectal cancer and Sgg has been suggested as Sgg stimulates increased production of collagen in colorectal cancer cells, which in turn improves Sgg's ability to adhere to these cells. Sgg also alters the extracellular matrix through increased collagen production of CRC cells, contributing to cancer-cell proliferation and tumor growth. Due to the diversity of Sgg strains and the complex relationship, the exact mechanisms and directionality are still being researched.

In experiments with mice, tumor-associated changes in secondary bile acids enhanced gallocin activity and favored Sgg persistence. These findings describe a potential mechanism of preferential colonization in tumor-bearing hosts, rather than demonstrating intestinal carriage causes cancer outright in humans.

==== Bacteremia ====
Bacteremia is a condition associated with several species within the SBSEC. The gastrointestinal tract is a proposed portal of entry for human Sgg infection, supported by studies showing passage across intestinal epithelial cells. Urinary and hepatobiliary infections have also been identified as sources of SBSEC bacteremia. The ability of the pathogen to survive in human blood varies widely based on strain of Sgg and the individual blood donor. Strain UCN34 has been found to be especially effective at surviving and multiplying within human blood in laboratory experiments. Sgg also interacts with elements of the blood's inflammatory and clotting mechanisms. Bacteremia is strongly linked to infective endocarditis, occurring in 33% of Sgg bacteremia episodes in one study (n=52) and 40% in another (n=5).

==== Infective endocarditis ====
Sgg was the primary pathogen associated with the majority of SBSEC infective endocarditis cases. A 2023 study found patients with Sgg bloodstream infection were 2.57 times more likely to develop infective endocarditis compared to patients with other streptococcal bloodstream infections.

The pil1 pilus's affinity for collagen makes Sgg especially effective in attaching to collagen-rich regions of the body. When pre-existing damage to the heart valve and bacteremia with Sgg occur together, collagen-binding proteins and pili of Sgg help the bacterium attach to exposed extracellular matrix and damaged heart valves.

=== Antibiotic resistance and treatment ===
Sgg strains often show antibiotic resistance, and in an analysis of 40 Sgg genomes in 2025, 85% carried at least one antibiotic resistance gene. Sgg frequently shows resistance to tetracycline, with tetracycline-resistance genes present in 82.5% of examined strains. Researchers attributed this to overuse in livestock and in human and veterinary medicine. Macrolides, another antibiotic class acting on bacterial ribosomes, are also antibiotics that some Sgg strains have developed resistance against. Combined resistance to aminoglycosides and macrolides has also been found in a study, as a result of transposons.

Most human-derived Sgg strains examined in the 2025 study showed resistance to multiple antibiotics. Separately, C5a peptidase, T7SS, capsule features, and bile-salt resistance contribute to the organism's potential for immune evasion, survival, and colonization.

A combination of penicillin and an aminoglycoside is a common treatment for Sgg infections. Treatment studies of penicillin-susceptible streptococcal endocarditis have also evaluated ceftriaxone alone or combined with gentamicin. A 2018 study reported no penicillin-resistant isolates at the time, while identifying transferable transposons carrying resistance to other antibiotics.

== Biotype II/1: S. infantarius subsp. infantarius (Sii) ==
=== Morphology and cellular characteristics ===
Sii is a subspecies of the SBSEC heavily associated with African dairy products. In a study conducted in Kenya and Somalia, Sii was found in 88% of 24 traditionally fermented camel milk samples. It has also been identified in Malian fermented milk samples. The dairy isolates exhibited a distinct metabolic pathway involving lactose and galactose. Their genomes contained a gal-lac operon absent from the other sequenced SBSEC strains examined, suggesting acquisition through horizontal gene transfer of a pathway homologous to one in Streptococcus thermophilus. Sii strain CJ18 also grows with glucose as the sole carbon source and possesses metabolic adaptations supporting growth in dairy products. Its efficient transport and consumption of lactose contribute to its competitiveness in the dairy environment.

=== Pathogenesis ===
The safety of Sii consumption has been heavily debated, and has even been considered beneficial in recent history, but a recent study determined that it is not safe for consumption due to its ability to outcompete other microbes in the gastrointestinal tract. In Kenyan patients, and similarly to other SBSEC members, Sii showed some correlation with colorectal cancer and hemorrhoids, which is concerning when considering the daily consumption of Sii by a large population.

=== Antibiotic resistance and treatment ===
The antibiotic resistant gene vanB has been found in Sii strains, suggesting that some strains may be resistant to vancomycin and may have acquired this gene through horizontal gene transfer. The strains, however, did not contain any other antibiotic resistance gene of note, meaning that Sii infection can still be treated using other common antimicrobials.

The most effective treatment for Sii is to ensure proper heat treatment and pasteurization of milk before fermentation. This step will ensure that the milk does not contain an unsafe amount of Sii before being consumed.

== Biotype II/2: S. gallolyticus subsp. pasteurianus (SGSP) ==
Transmission electron micrograph of Streptococcus gallolyticus subsp. pasteurianus strain NCTC13784 (serotype 1a), showing encapsulated cells.

=== Pathogenesis ===
SGSP can be isolated in humans from blood, urine, normally sterile bodily fluid, fetal membrane, and placental samples. SGSP is associated with bacteremia, infective endocarditis, urinary tract infections, meningitis, gastrointestinal malignancy, and intrauterine infections in humans. In a study from China, women accounted for 62.2% of 45 patients with SGSP infection. UTI and bacteremia were the most common infections in the non-pregnant patient group.

In a group of 2-3 week-old goslings, increased mortality was observed, and post-mortem analysis revealed detrimental effects of SGSP infection. Congestion and hemorrhages of the viscera were observed, and samples of various tissues were stained and revealed the presence of SGSP resulting in septicaemia. Fatal septicaemia from SGSP infection has also been studied in pigeon and turkey populations.

=== Antibiotic resistance and treatment ===
Some isolates of SGSP show resistance to clindamycin, erythromycin, tetracycline, and levofloxacin. But, all of the isolates were susceptible to treatment using penicillin, ampicillin, cefotaxime, meropenem, and vancomycin.
