= Alphonse Dochez =

American physician

Alphonse Raymond Dochez
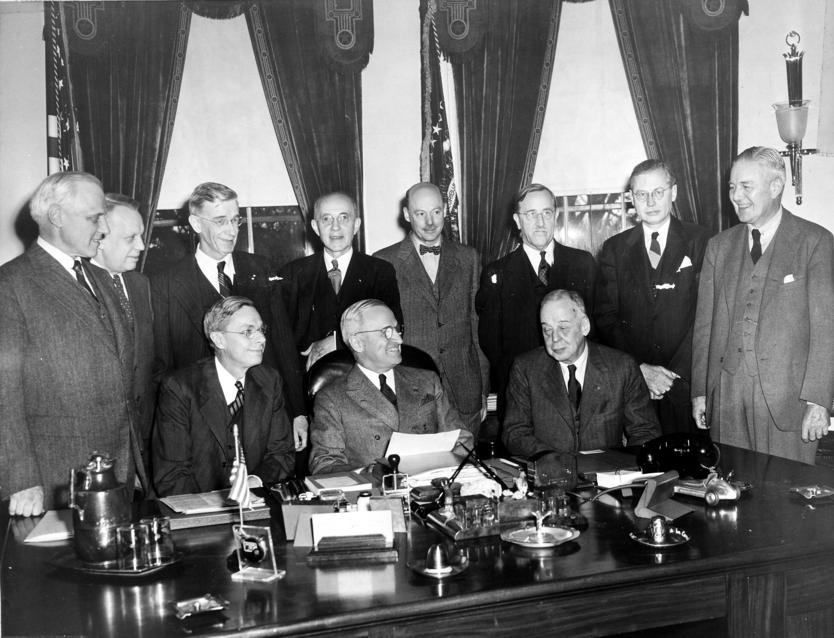
- Dochez at a National Defense Research Committee meeting in 1947.
- Born: April 21, 1882; San Francisco, CA
- Died: June 30, 1964 (aged 82); New York, NY
- Education: Johns Hopkins University
- Known for: Pioneering studies of pneumonia, scarlet fever, and the common cold.
- Partner: Oswald Avery
- Scientific career
- Fields: Bacteriology
- Workplaces: Rockefeller University; Johns Hopkins University; Columbia University

Alphonse Raymond Dochez (April 21, 1882 – June 30, 1964) was an American physician and microbiologist. His research focused on infectious diseases, including scarlet fever, the common cold, and pneumococcal pneumonia. Dochez is credited with developing the first effective treatment for scarlet fever. His work also established viruses as the cause of the common cold.

== Early life and education ==
Dochez was born in San Francisco to Louis and Josephine Dietrich Dochez. His family is of Belgian descent. Dochez moved to Indianapolis as a young child, then later to Harford County, Maryland. His parents operated a farm, and he developed a strong interest in hunting and fishing. Dochez received a B.A. from Johns Hopkins University in 1903, and an M.D. in 1907.

== Career ==
After graduation, Dochez worked at the laboratory of pathology at Hopkins investigating the effects of iodine-free diets on animals. After one year, he applied to work at the Rockefeller Institute for Medical Research (now Rockefeller University). He obtained a fellowship position with Eugene Opie. Together they published four papers on enzyme activation. In 1910, Dochez became an assistant resident and bacteriologist at Rockefeller Hospital, despite lacking prior background in the field. From this time on, he remained a microbiologist. While he was assistant resident, Dochez contributed to major studies on lobar and bronchial pneumonia. Dochez developed a biological classification of types of pneumococci. With Oswald Avery, he discovered the soluble substance that confers type-specificity upon pneumococci. Their work demonstrated that the substance was of capsular origin and present in both blood and urine of infected patients. The two, who often collaborated, also revealed the importance of type-specific antibodies in recovery from pneumococcal pneumonia. This discovery lead to the production of the first effective pneumococcal pneumonia therapy. The therapy, using type-specific anti-pneumococcal horse serum, was used until the development of sulfonamides and penicillin.

During World War I, Dochez served as a major in the Medical Corps where he studied respiratory diseases. In 1919, he became an associate professor of medicine at Johns Hopkins Medical School. At Hopkins, he began studying streptococcus and scarlet fever. He continued this work at the College of Physicians and Surgeons of Columbia University, where he became faculty in 1921. Dochez's work was the first to demonstrate that scarlet fever was directly related to streptococcal pharyngitis. He also demonstrated that most strains of streptococci from scarlet fever patients belonged to a single specific type of bacteria. Dochez developed an antiserum capable of treating scarlet fever, but was forced to terminate production, and all further research on scarlet fever, due to patent infringement.

Forced to switch fields, Dochez initiated studies on a different type of infection: the Common Cold. Dochez and collaborators confirmed that the common cold was not caused by bacteria by demonstrating that the infection could be induced by exposure to bacteria-free substances. He concluded that the common cold was likely of viral etiology, but techniques of the time period were not sophisticated enough to prove this conclusively.

Dochez was chair of the Department of Bacteriology at the College of Physicians and Surgeons at Columbia University from 1940 to 1949. He retired in 1949 and was honored as the John E. Borne Professor of Medical and Surgical Research Emeritus. Until his death Dochez continued his scientific research, focusing on carcinogenesis in his later years.

== Personal life ==
Although he never came out of the closet while alive, a modern scholar believes Dochez was gay. His coworker was Oswald Avery, with whom he shared an apartment for decades. Dochez was a devout Catholic.

== Legacy ==
During his academic career, Dochez received many honors. Starting with his service in WWII, Dochez advised many governmental agencies. He was a member of the Office of Scientific Research and Development and the National Defense Research Committee. He served on the Board for Coordination of Malarial Studies, the Board for Control of Influenza and Other Epidemic Diseases, and the Hoover Commission on the reorganization of the executive branch of the government. He was awarded the United States Medal of Merit in 1948. He also received the Kober Medal of the Association of American Physicians in 1949 and the Medal of the New York Academy of Medicine in 1958.

Dochez served as president of the American Association of Immunologists, the Association of American Physicians, and the American Clinical and Climatological Association. In 1933, he was elected to the National Academy of Sciences. He received honorary degrees from New York University (1925), Yale University (1926), and Case Western Reserve University (1931).

In addition to his research career, Dochez was remembered for encouraging and engaging with all members of his lab.
