= Streptococcus dysgalactiae subsp. equisimilis =

Scientific classification
- Domain: Bacteria
- Kingdom: Bacillati
- Phylum: Bacillota
- Class: Bacilli
- Order: Lactobacillales
- Family: Streptococcaceae
- Genus: Streptococcus
- Species: S. dysgalactiae
- Subspecies: S. d. subsp. equisimilis

Trinomial name
- Streptococcus dysgalactiae subsp. equisimilis Vandamme et al. 1996

Species of bacterium

Streptococcus dysgalactiae subsp. equisimilis is a species of Streptococcus, initially described by Frost in 1936. As a result of several DNA hybridization studies in 1983, the species was merged into Streptococcus dysgalactiae. Subsequently, S. dysgalactiae was divided into the subspecies Streptococcus dysgalactiae subsp. equisimilis and Streptococcus dysgalactiae subsp. dysgalactiae. Although the name Streptococcus equisimilis is no longer valid, it is still encountered both in clinical practice, and in scientific journals.
