= Rebecca Lancefield =

American microbiologist (1895–1981)

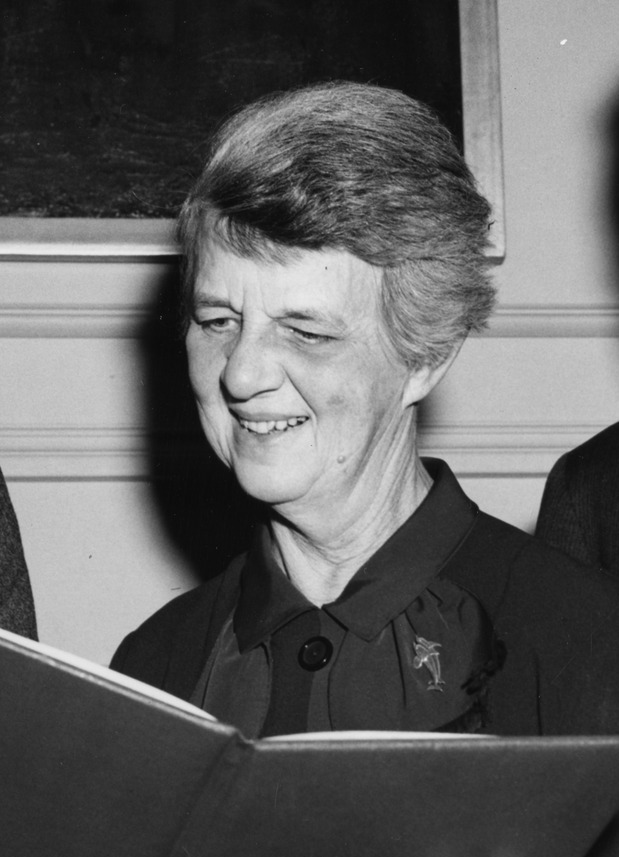
- Lancefield in 1960
- Born: January 5, 1895; New York City, U.S.
- Died: March 3, 1981 (aged 86)
- Education: Wellesley College (B.A.); Columbia University (M.S. & PhD)
- Known for: Lancefield grouping
- Spouse: Donald Lancefield
- Awards: T. Duckett Jones Award; Medal of the New York Academy of Medicine
- Scientific career
- Fields: Bacteriology; Immunology
- Workplaces: Rockefeller University; Columbia University
- Doctoral advisor: Hans Zinsser
- Other academic advisors: Oswald Avery; Alphonse Dochez

Rebecca Craighill Lancefield (January 5, 1895 – March 3, 1981) was an American microbiologist. She joined the Rockefeller Institute for Medical Research (now Rockefeller University) in New York in 1918, and was associated with that institute throughout her career. Her bibliography comprises more than 50 publications published over 60 years.

Lancefield is best known for her serological classification of β-hemolytic streptococcal bacteria, Lancefield grouping, which is based on the carbohydrate composition of bacterial antigens found on their cell walls. She is also responsible for the serological typing of group A streptococci.

== Early life and education ==
Lancefield was born at Fort Wadsworth, Staten Island, New York. Her father was an officer in the US Army Engineer Corps. Her mother Mary Wortley Byram was related to Lady Mary Wortley Montagu, who had a large impact in promoting smallpox vaccinations. She attended Wellesley College in Massachusetts. After graduating in 1916 with a degree in zoology, she taught math and science at a girls school in Vermont for one year. She accepted a scholarship to Teachers' College, Columbia University, and continued to study bacteriology. Lancefield received her master's degree from Columbia in 1918. The same year, she married Donald E. Lancefield, a fellow graduate student in genetics at Columbia. After graduation, she worked as a technician for Oswald Avery and Alphonse Dochez at Rockefeller. The following year, she returned to Columbia to study on Drosophila willistoni under Charles W. Metz.

== Career and research ==
Lancefield's first co-authored paper was published in 1919 when she was a technician, an unusual recognition at the time. Previous to this work, researchers did not know if different streptococcal strains were biologically distinct. Working with Avery and Dochez, she identified four serological types that classified 70 percent of the β-hemolytic streptococcal strains they were studying.

For her PhD thesis, Lancefield studied viridans streptococci. Lancefield originally joined the lab of Hans Zinsser. Zinsser did not want to work with women, and suggested she move her work to the lab of Homer Swift. Therefore, the majority of her work was carried out at Rockefeller, where Swift's lab was located. At the time, viridans streptococci were incorrectly believed to contribute to rheumatic fever. Lancefield's thesis work helped dispel this idea.

After her PhD, Lancefield returned to studying β-hemolytic streptococci at Rockefeller. She now aimed to identify the biological components of surface antigens located on the bacteria. In 1928, Lancefield reported that the type-specific antigen of streptococci was a protein. She named this protein the M-protein because a matt colony occurs when the bacteria is exposed to the antigen. Lancefield discovered that the group-specific antigen of streptococci was composed of carbohydrates, which she named the C-carbohydrate. Within this discovery, Lancefield revealed that the C-carbohydrate was not species-specific, as originally thought. This realization prompted her development of a classification system, called Lancefield grouping, for streptococcal diseases. She initially designated group A for human streptococcal infections and group B for bovine streptococcal infections. Today, Lancefield groups include groups A through M.

Lancefield discovered two additional group A streptococci surface proteins: the T-antigen, in 1940, and the R-antigen, in 1957. Later in her career, she focused on group B streptococci. Her research revealed that group B streptococci lacked the M-protein. She discovered that, instead, surface polysaccharides were responsible for their virulence factor.

During World War II, Lancefield served on the Commission on Streptococcal and Staphylococcal Diseases of the Armed Forces Epidemiological Board. In 1946, Lancefield was promoted to associate member at Rockefeller University. She was promoted to full member and professor at Rockefeller in 1958. Lancefield was a long-time collaborator of Maclyn McCarty and a mentor of Emil Gotschlich, two recipients of the notable Lasker Prize.

== Honors ==
In 1943, she was the second woman to become president of the Society of American Bacteriologists. In 1961, she became president of the American Association of Immunologists, the first woman to hold the position. She was elected to the National Academy of Sciences in 1970. In 1973, she was awarded an honorary Doctor of Science by Rockefeller University. She was formally honored by Wellesley College, her alma mater, in 1976. Lancefield received many awards, including the T. Duckett Jones Award of the Helen Hay Whitney Foundation, the American Heart Association Achievement Award, and the Medal of the New York Academy of Medicine.

== Death and legacy ==
Lancefield's recipe for eggnog has been used by her fellow scientists for decades and was published on Science Friday.

Due to Lancefield's willingness to answer microbiological questions, her lab at Rockefeller earned the nickname "the Scotland Yard of streptococcal mysteries."

The Lancefield International Symposium on Streptococci and Streptococcal Diseases is named in her honor. The samples collected over her career are now maintained by Rockefeller University as the Lancefield collection. To date, the collection includes over 6,000 streptococci strains.
