= Oligoclonal antibody =

Antibody-based immunotherapy

Oligoclonal antibodies are an emerging immunological treatment relying on the combinatory use of several monoclonal antibodies (mAb) in one single drug. The composition can be made of mAb targeting different epitopes of a same protein (homo-combination) or mAb targeting different proteins (hetero-combination). It mimicks the natural polyclonal humoral immunological response to get better efficiency of the treatment. This strategy is most efficient in infections and in cancer treatment as it allow to overcome acquired resistance by pathogens and the plasticity of cancers.

== History ==
Oligoclonal antibody treatment is a part of the serotherapy strategy (or antiserum).

19th century: Serotherapy was initiated thanks to Shibasaburo Kitasato and Emil von Behring in Germany, and Emile Roux in France. It is the administration of animal or human serum that was previously exposed to a pathogen and thus contains antibodies against it and will help the patient to fight infection.

1975 and 1986: First mAb was produced by hybridomas technique and then fully licensed. It was great progress since it allows targeting of specific epitope that can be shared among several diseases.

1982: Combination of two antibodies to enhance the immune response against viruses.

2000's: Several research teams came up with the idea of combining antibodies against different epitopes of the same receptor in cancer treatment. Particularly in anti-EGFR, anti-HER2 or anti-cMET combinations.

2010: Combination of two antibodies against immune control checkpoint to enhance cytotoxic T lymphocytes response and inhibit regulatory T lymphocytes suppressive effect on the immune response.

2012: First oligoclonal antibody combination was approved for use. It is composed of trastuzumab and pertuzumab both targeting HER-2 in breast cancer.

Numerous studies on animal models or in clinical trials are currently ongoing for treatment of infections and cancers.

== Infectious diseases treatment ==
In infection oligoclonal treatment may be used to directly target the pathogen (e.g. surface marker on viruses or bacterias) or to neutralize toxins (e.g. botulinum neurotoxins, Clostridioides difficile toxins).

Many pathogens show increasing resistance to currently available drugs, especially antibiotics. This is particularly true for bacteria, but they harbor many membrane surface markers that can be targeted by antibodies. Oligoclonal treatment is recognized to have the potential to address this issue by aiming for multiple surface proteins and still can bind to proteins after mutation even if the affinity is lowered. However, most of these treatments are still in the stage of clinical trials.

== Oncologic treatment ==
In cancer treatment, several targets and strategies can be used:

- Targeting cancer cell markers (e.g. mutated EGFR, HER2): it raises antibody-dependent cell-mediated cytotoxicity (ADCC) response against tumor cells.
- Targeting secreted signaling proteins of tumoral environment (e.g. VEGF neutralization) : limiting tumor environment, for example blocking angiogenesis.
- Targeting immune cells regulation checkpoints : inhibition of T regulatory cells downregulatory effects (e.g. using antagonist against CTLA-4), activation of cytotoxic T cells (e.g. using antagonist against PD-1). The goal is to activate the immune cells by lifting self-tolerance checkpoints that are restraining T cells to attack tumor cells.

Today, more than 300 antibody combinations are undergoing phase II or phase III clinical trials for various targets and cancer types (both solid and liquid). Most of them are targeting immune checkpoints (CTLA-4, PD1/PD-L1, ...). The only oligoclonal antibody treatment against immune checkpoint currently approved is the cocktail of nivolumab (anti-PD1 antibody) and ipilimumab (anti-CTLA-4 antibody). It is used to treat melanomas, low-risk renal cancer and colorectal cancer. This combination is also on phase III clinical trial to be used to treat non-small lung cancer, it shows good efficacy.

Treatments on non-small lung cancer have shown higher efficiency on patient with tumors of heavy mutational background. This underlines the potential of oligoclonal treatments to tackle cancer plasticity.

== See also ==
- Monoclonal antibody
- Polyclonal antibodies
- Immunotherapy
