= Lymphokine =

Cytokine produced by lymphocytes

In cell biology, the lymphokines are a subset of cytokines that are produced by a type of immune cell known as a lymphocyte. They are protein mediators typically produced by T cells to direct the immune system response by signaling between its cells. Lymphokines have many roles, including the attraction of other immune cells, including macrophages and other lymphocytes, to an infected site and their subsequent activation to prepare them to mount an immune response. Circulating lymphocytes can detect a very small concentration of lymphokine and then move up the concentration gradient towards where the immune response is required. Lymphokines aid B cells to produce antibodies.

Important lymphokines secreted by the T helper cell include:

- Interleukin 2
- Interleukin 3
- Interleukin 4
- Interleukin 5
- Interleukin 6
- Granulocyte-macrophage colony-stimulating factor
- Interferon-gamma

== Types ==
The T helper cell secretes many lymphokines that are important when it comes to the regulation of the immune system. A list of important lymphokines consist of interleukin-2, interleukin-3, interleukin-4, interleukin-5, interleukin-6, granulocyte-macrophage colony-stimulating factor, and interferon-gamma. Each of these lymphokines does have its own role and specialized function with immune cells. The difference of performed actions actually benefits the way the immune system responds to a variety of pathogens. To explain a few of the actions of the lymphokines, interleukin-2 activates T-cells, interleukin-4 regulates the way B-cells respond, and interferon-gamma activates macrophages but also can make immune defenses stronger.

Lymphokines are signaling proteins that are released during an immune response. They are released when lymphocytes and T helper cells are activated and will essentially travel to the target cell where it will then bind to specific receptors on that cell surface. The motive behind this binding is so that immune cells will respond appropriately to the infection or tissue damage. It is also important to consider that if a cell does not align with a receptor that is appropriate it will not respond to a lymphokine unless it is correct. Overall signaling molecules help maintain regulation of immune responses by activating and coordinating different types of immune cells.

Once lymphokines have binded to specific receptors, signaling processes will begin to occur. Ultimately the type of response that ends up happening will depend on the type of lymphokine and the receptor because they do not all behave the same. To name a few examples, some cells can multiply, others can differentiate, and some can even become activated. In the end these combined actions will do a better job at aiding immune responses to be more effective.

== Functions in the immune system ==
Lymphokines are essential to the functioning of the immune system, serving as regulators of cell communication between immune cells during an immune response. If these cells did not receive any of the necessary signaling proteins, then the immune cells would not be able to respond properly to the infection or tissue damage. It is extremely beneficial that the lymphokines aid immune cell communication because without correct timing or activation the body would not be able to effectively respond.

Moreover, the effect that lymphokines have on immune cells is another important aspect of how it allows the immune system to stay coordinated. B-cells and T cells are two examples of this. T cells are critical because they are able to recognize and eliminate cells that are considered to be harmful to the body. If T cells were not able to communicate then it would be unfortunate for any immune system response and could interfere with the detection of pathogens. Therefore, lymphokine aids T cells with not just communication but how they keep the balance of the immune system by carrying out the functions necessary for immune cell activity. On the other hand, antibodies are also critical for our body and its defenses. This is where B cells come in, they are responsible for the production of antibodies and without them we would not be able to have immunity. So ultimately, both of these immune cells each provide their own beneficial service to the immune system but each part that is performed really does contribute to the body and how it provides a healthy immune system.
