= Friedrich Julius Rosenbach =

German physician and microbiologist

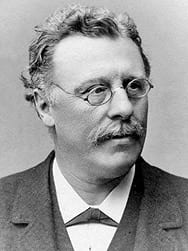

Friedrich Julius Rosenbach (16 December 1842 – 6 December 1923), also known as Anton Julius Friedrich Rosenbach, was a German physician and microbiologist. He is credited for differentiating Staphylococcus aureus and Staphylococcus albus, which is now called Staphylococcus epidermidis, in 1884. He also described and named Streptococcus pyogenes. Rosenbach's disease is also named in his honor.

== Biography ==
Rosenbach was born in Grohnde an der Weser on 16 December 1842. He studied in Heidelberg, Göttingen, Vienna, Paris, and Berlin. He obtained his doctorate in 1867. He married Franziska Merkel on 12 May 1877. Rosenbach died on 6 December 1923 in Göttingen.

== Literature ==
- Ueber einige pathologische Veränderungen nach subcutaner Injection von Quecksilber bei Thieren (Kaninchen). Doctoral dissertation, 1867. Also in [Henle and Pfeuffer's] Zeitschrift für rationelle Medicin, Leipzig and Heidelberg.
- Untersuchungen über den Einfluss von Carbolsäure gegen das Zustandekommen der pyämischen und putriden Infection bei Tieren. Habilitation thesis for Privatdozent, Göttingen, 1872.
- Mikro-Organismen bei den Wund-infections-krankheiten des Menschen. Wiesbaden, J. F. Bergmann, 1884.
- Zur Aetiologie des Wundstarrkrampfes der Menschen. Verhandlungen der deutschen Gesellschaft für Chirurgie, Berlin, 1886.
- Über das Erysipeloid. Verhandlungen der Deutschen Gesellschaft für Chirurgie, 1887.
- Experimentelle Beiträge zur Frage: Kann Eiterung ohne Mitbetheiligung von Microorganismen durch todte Stoffe entstehen? With Kreibohm. Verhandlungen der deutschen Gesellschaft für Chirurgie, 1888.
- Der Hospitalbrand. Deutsche Chirurgie, volume 6, Stuttgart 1888.
- Über die tieferen eiternden Schimmelerkrankungen der Haut und deren Ursachen. Wiesbaden, 1894.
- Über die tiefen und eiternden Trichophyton-Erkrankungen und deren Krankheitserreger. Transactions of the Third International Congress of Dermatology, London, 1896.
- Behandlung der Gangrän und Phlegmon in Umgebung der Mundhöhle, Noma, Phlegmonen; Angina Ludovici, gewöhnl. Phlegm., Scharlachphlegmon, Glossitis, Hemiglossitisphlegmon. Chapter in Handbuch der Therapie innerer Krankheiten, by Franz Penzoldt and Roderich Stintzing, 1898.
- Chirurgische Knochen- und Gelenkkrankheiten. Chapter in Handbuch der praktischen Medizin, edited by Wilhelm Ebstein (1836-1912) and Gustav Albert Schwalbe (1844-1916).
- Biography in H. R. Grote: Die Medizin der Gegenwart in Selbstdarstellungen. Leipzig, 1923; volume 2, page 187.
