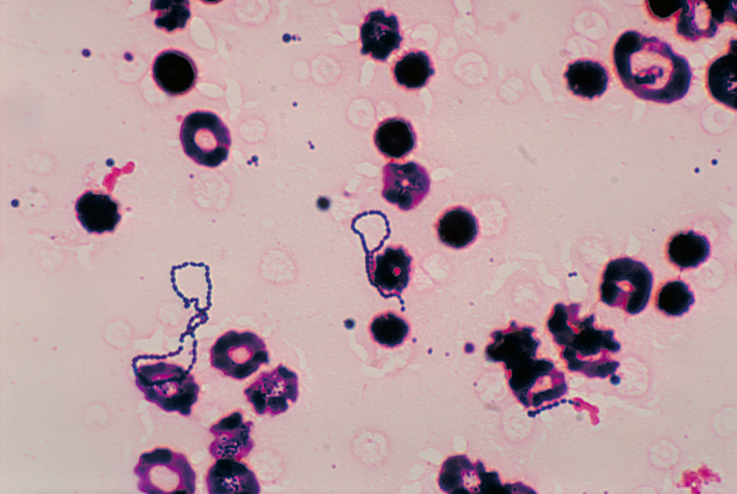

Scientific classification
- Domain: Bacteria
- Kingdom: Bacillati
- Phylum: Bacillota
- Class: Bacilli
- Order: Lactobacillales
- Family: Streptococcaceae
- Genus: Streptococcus

= Viridans streptococci =

Species of bacterium

The viridans streptococci are a large group of commensal streptococcal Gram-positive bacteria species that are α-hemolytic, producing a green coloration on blood agar plates (hence the name "viridans", from Latin "vĭrĭdis", green), although some species in this group are actually γ-hemolytic, meaning they produce no change on blood agar. The pseudo-taxonomic term "Streptococcus viridans" is often used to refer to this group of species, but writers who do not like to use the pseudotaxonomic term (which treats a group of species as if they were one species) prefer the terms viridans streptococci, viridans group streptococci (VGS), or viridans streptococcal species.

These species possess no Lancefield antigens. In general, pathogenicity is low.

== Identification ==
Viridans streptococci can be differentiated from Streptococcus pneumoniae using an optochin test, as viridans streptococci are optochin-resistant; they also lack either the polysaccharide-based capsule typical of S. pneumoniae or the Lancefield antigens of the pyogenic members of the genus.

	Viridans streptococci	Streptococcus pneumoniae
Lysed in bile	Insoluble	Soluble
Fermentation of inulin	Not a fermenter	Fermenter with acid production
Sensitivity to optochin	Not sensitive	Sensitive
Pathogenicity to mice	Nonpathogenic	Pathogenic
Quellung test (not actively used)	Negative	Positive

== Pathology ==
The organisms are most abundant in the mouth, and one member of the group, S. mutans, is the cause of dental caries in most cases and populations. S. sanguinis is also another potential cause. Others may be involved in other mouth or gingival infections as pericoronitis. If they are introduced into the bloodstream, they have the potential of causing endocarditis, in particular in individuals with damaged heart valves. They are the most common causes of subacute bacterial endocarditis. Viridans streptococci are identified in cases of neonatal infections.

Viridans streptococci have the unique ability to synthesize dextrans from glucose, which allows them to adhere to fibrin-platelet aggregates at damaged heart valves. This mechanism underlies their ability to cause subacute valvular heart disease following their introduction into the bloodstream (e.g., following dental extraction).

== Identification ==
The "viridans" group is somewhat of a wastebasket or "grab bag" in streptococci classification. It includes at least the following species groups (some of which include non-commensal members):

- S. anginosus group, which beyond its namesake include S. constellatus, S. intermedius, etc. Known for a butterscotch odor. This group also includes beta-hemolytic and nonhemolytic species, highlighting the taxonomic unreliability of some phenotype-based classifications.
- S. mitis group, which beyond its namesake include S. oralis, S. pseudopneumoniae, S. pneumoniae, etc. This group has >99% 16S rRNA sequence homology.
- S. sanguinis group, which beyond its namesake include S. parasanguinis, S. gordonii, etc. Close to the mitis group in terms of 16S, but very different in phenotype.
- S. bovis group, which beyond its namesake include S. equinus, S. gallolyticus, S. infantarius, etc. They are the nonenterococcal group D streptococci.
- S. salivarius group, which beyond its namesake include S. vestibularis, S. thermophilus, etc. Closely related to the bovis group.
- S. mutans group, which beyond its namesake include S. sobrinus, etc.

In other words, the "viridans" group actually includes species from all six traditional 16S groups of Streptococcus (see Streptococcus § Molecular taxonomy and phylogenetics) – very much a grab bag. Doern and Burnham (2010) provides a good overview on the identification, both phenotypic and molecular, of the VGS.
