= Pneumococcal pneumonia =

Infection of the lungs by Streptococcus bacteria

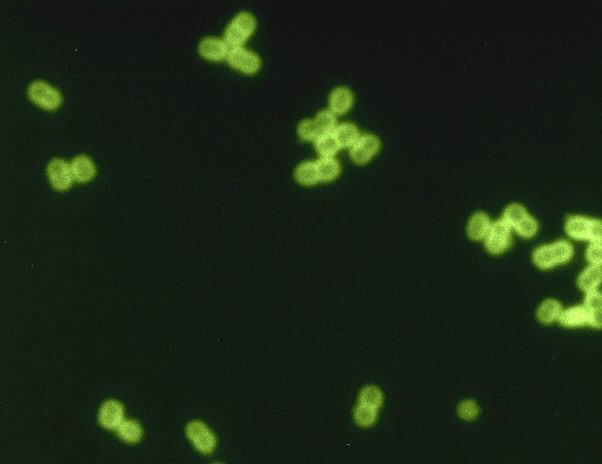
- Streptococcus pneumoniae
- Specialty: Pulmonology
- Symptoms: Fever, coughing up blood, chest pain, shortness of breath
- Complications: Empyema, lung abscess, pericarditis, sepsis, meningitis
- Usual onset: 1 to 3 days
- Causes: Streptococcus pneumoniae
- Risk factors: Infants, elderly, weak immune system
- Diagnostic method: Based on symptoms, chest X-ray, sputum culture
- Prevention: Pneumococcal vaccine

Pneumococcal pneumonia is a type of bacterial pneumonia that is caused by Streptococcus pneumoniae (pneumococcus). It is the most common bacterial pneumonia found in adults, the most common type of community-acquired pneumonia, and one of the common types of pneumococcal infection. The estimated number of Americans with pneumococcal pneumonia is 900,000 annually, with almost 400,000 cases hospitalized and fatalities accounting for 5–7% of these cases.

== Signs and symptoms ==
The symptoms of pneumococcal pneumonia can occur suddenly, presenting as a severe chill, followed by a severe fever, cough, shortness of breath, rapid breathing, and chest pains. Other symptoms like nausea, vomiting, headache, fatigue, and muscle aches could also accompany initial symptoms. The coughing can occasionally produce rusty or blood-streaked sputum. In 25% of cases, a parapneumonic effusion may occur. Chest X-rays will typically show lobar consolidation or patchy infiltrates.

== Treatment ==
In most cases, once pneumococcal pneumonia has been identified, doctors will prescribe antibiotics. These antibiotics usually help alleviate and eliminate symptoms between 12 and 36 hours after the initial dose. Despite most antibiotics' effectiveness in treating the disease, sometimes the bacteria can resist the antibiotics, causing symptoms to worsen. Age and health of the infected patient can also contribute to the effectiveness of the antibiotics. A vaccine has been developed for the prevention of pneumococcal pneumonia, recommended to children under age five as well as adults over the age of 65.

== Mechanism ==
Three stages can be used to categorize the infection process of pneumococcal pneumonia: transmission, colonization, and invasion. The Streptococcus pneumoniae (S. pneumoniae) leave the colonized host via shedding in order to be transmissible to new hosts, and must survive in the environment until infection of a new host (unless direct transmission occurs). Animal models have allowed scientists to have an increased understanding of these stages of infection.

=== Transmission ===
In order for transmission to occur, there must be close contact with a carrier or amongst carriers. The likelihood of this increases during colder, dryer months of the year. The probability of transmission is shown to proliferate in coordination with other upper respiratory tract (URT) infections.

Animal models have allowed for an increased understanding of the transmission stage during infection. A 2010 study examining co-infection of influenza in co-housed ferret pairs found that the influenza increased both incidence and severity of pneumococcal infection. These findings exhibited pneumococcal strain dependence. A separate 2010 study examining intra-litter transmission, with influenza co-infection in infant mice, found that the influenza co-infection is a facilitator for pneumococcal susceptibility, transmission, and disease via bacterial shedding. A third study of note, from 2016, was able to examine pneumococcal transmission without co-infection of an URT infection. This study utilized intra-litter transmission in infant mice during bacterial mono-infection with pneumococcus. The results of this study indicated higher rates of shedding for infections in younger mice.

These studies, along with the animal models that they utilize have enhanced our understanding of the transmission of pneumococcus. Inflammation induced by influenza A virus (IAV) stimulates the flow of mucus through the expression of glycoproteins, prompts secretion, and increases shedding. Streptococcus is found in the inflammation-generated mucus layers covering the URT and increased pneumococci are observed in nasal secretions with IAV co-infection. Levels of shedding have correlations with IAV induced URT inflammation. Pro-inflammatory effects are exhibited by the single pneumococcal toxin, pneumolysin (Ply); use of anti-Ply antibodies result in decreased inflammation. Studies have found transmissible levels of bacterium only in young mice, exhibiting that shedding increases with incidences of contact and proximity. Shedding is shown to decrease in the presence of agglutinating antibodies such as IgG and IgA1 unless cleavage occurs via an IgA1-specific pneumococcal protease.

Transmission via the secretions of carriers can result from direct interpersonal contact or contact with a contaminated surface. Bacteria on contaminated surfaces can be easily cultured. In conditions with sufficient nutrients, pneumococci can survive for 24 hours and avoid desiccation for multiple days.

Reduced transmission has been observed amongst children with pneumococcal conjugate vaccine (PCV) immunization as acquisition of a new strain of S. pneumoniae is inhibited by pre-existing colonization. Immunoglobulin G (IgG) immunization with high antibody concentration can also inhibit acquisition. These antibodies require the agglutinating function of the Fc fragment.

For successful acquisition in a new host, pneumococcus must successfully adhere to the mucous membrane of the new host's nasopharynx. Pneumococcus is able to evade detection by the mucous membrane when there is a higher proportion of negatively charged capsules. This clearance is mediated by Immunoglobulin A1 (IgA1) which is abundant on the URT mucosal surfaces.

=== Colonization ===
Transparent and opaque colony morphology has been observed for pneumococci. Airway colonization is observed in transparent phenotypes of serotypes, while survival in bloodstreams is observed for opaque phenotypes. Colonizable strains exhibit resistance against neutrophilic immune response.

Successful colonization requires S. pnuemoniae to evade detection by the nasal mucus and attach to epithelial surface receptors. Asymptomatic colonization occurs when S. pneumoniae bind to N-acetyl-glucosamine on epithelium without inflammation. However, co-infection with a pre-existing inflammatory URT infection results in an over-expression of the epithelial receptors utilized by S. pneumoniae, thus increasing the likelihood of colonization. Neuraminidase also increases instances of epithelial binding through its cleavage of N-acetylneuraminic acid, glycolipids, glycoproteins, and oligosaccharides.

=== Invasion ===
Initial colonization of the nasopharynx is typically asymptomatic, but invasion occurs when the bacteria spreads to other parts of the body including the lungs, blood, and brain. Interactions between phosphorylcholine (ChoP) components on colonized epithelial cells allow for docking of choline binding proteins (CBPs), most notably CbpA. Colonization of the respiratory tract, and thus pneumonia cannot occur without CpbA.

The pneumococcus moves across the mucosal barrier by integrating itself with the polymeric immunoglobulin receptor (pIgR), which is used by mucosal epithelial cells to transport IgA and IgM to the apical surface. Following its cleavage at the apical surface, pIgR, and subsequently the pneumococcus, move back to the basolateral surface allowing invasion of the upper respiratory tract.

The pneumococcus then moves to invade the lower respiratory tract, evading the mucociliary escalator with the assistance of neuraminidase.

== Research ==
While it has been commonly known that the influenza virus increases one's chances of contracting pneumonia or meningitis caused by the streptococcus pneumonaie bacteria, new medical research in mice indicates that the flu is actually a necessary component for the transmission of the disease. Researcher Dimitri Diavatopoulo from the Radboud University Nijmegen Medical Centre in the Netherlands describes his observations in mice, stating that in these animals, the spread of the bacteria only occurs between animals already infected with the influenza virus, not between those without it. He says that these findings have only been inclusive in mice; however, he believes that the same could be true for humans.
