= Streptococcus vestibularis =

Scientific classification
- Domain: Bacteria
- Kingdom: Bacillati
- Phylum: Bacillota
- Class: Bacilli
- Order: Lactobacillales
- Family: Streptococcaceae
- Genus: Streptococcus
- Species: S. vestibularis

Binomial name
- Streptococcus vestibularis Whiley and Hardie 1988

Species of bacterium

Streptococcus vestibularis (S. vestibularis) is a species of Streptococcus. It is a commensal bacterium that can occasionally cause opportunistic infections within its human host. It is part of the viridans streptococci, and has been identified as a member of the salivarius group of streptococci through sequence homology of the 16S rRNA (ribosomal ribonucleic acid) gene. This group includes Streptococcus salivarius, Streptococcus thermophilus and Streptococcus vestibularis, which are genetically similar species of Streptococcus.

== Biology and ecology ==
Streptococcus vestibularis was first isolated from the vestibular mucosa of human oral cavities, and was identified as a new species in 1988. It is noted that “Streptococcus vestibularis is a normal inhabitant of vestibules of the human oral cavity”, therefore forming part of the oral microbiome. Streptococcus vestibularis cells are gram-positive and cocci in shape. They are catalase-negative as they do not have the enzyme catalase, which protects catalase-positive bacteria from hydrogen peroxide by converting it into hydrogen and oxygen. They grow in chains and have a diameter of approximately 1 μm. They are non-motile and non-spore forming.

Streptococcus vestibularis produces acid from N-acetyl glucosamine, arbutin, fructose, galactose, glucose, lactose, maltose, mannose, salicin, and sucrose, although it does not produce extracellular glucan or fructan from sucrose. It also produces urease (an enzyme that catalyses the hydrolysis of urea) and hydrogen peroxide. It is unable to grow in conditions of 10 °C or 45 °C, whilst colonies can grow anaerobically at 37 °C. Also, this bacterium is unable to grow when in the presence of 4% (wt/vol) sodium chloride (NaCl) or 0.0004% (wt/vol) crystal violet.

== Symptoms ==
Streptococcus vestibularis is classified as a level 2 biohazard in Canada and France and a level 1 biohazard in Germany. Research onto the specifics of Streptococcus vestibularis has been limited however papers have linked it to rejection in prosthetic heart valve implants. Additionally, significant amounts were found amongst patients with neonatal sepsis though a causal link was not established.

== Resistance ==
Streptococcus vestibularis has been reported to exhibit the highest level of antibiotic resistance among the viridans group streptococci (VGS) species examined. In one study, only 39.7% of isolates in the Streptococcus mitis group were susceptible to penicillin, with complete and intermediate resistance observed in 39.4% and 20.9% of cases, respectively. Resistance to ampicillin was found to be similar to that of penicillin. Within this study, seven isolates were identified specifically as S. vestibularis; among them, one isolate was resistant to both penicillin and ampicillin, while two showed intermediate resistance. Additionally, S. vestibularis demonstrated the highest resistance to erythromycin, with 40.9% of isolates showing resistance.
