= Coccolysin =

Enzyme

Identifiers
- EC no.: 3.4.24.30
- CAS no.: 156859-08-4

Databases
- IntEnz: IntEnz view
- BRENDA: BRENDA entry
- ExPASy: NiceZyme view
- KEGG: KEGG entry
- MetaCyc: metabolic pathway
- PRIAM: profile
- PDB structures: RCSB PDB PDBe PDBsum
Search
- PMC: articles
- PubMed: articles
- NCBI: proteins

Coccolysin (EC 3.4.24.30, Streptococcus thermophilus intracellular proteinase, EM 19000) is an enzyme. This enzyme catalyses the following chemical reaction

Preferential cleavage: -Leu, -Phe, -Tyr, -Ala

This endopeptidase is present in S. thermophilus, S. diacetilactis and S. faecalis.
