= Glycocalyx =

Carbohydrate-rich layer at the periphery of a cell

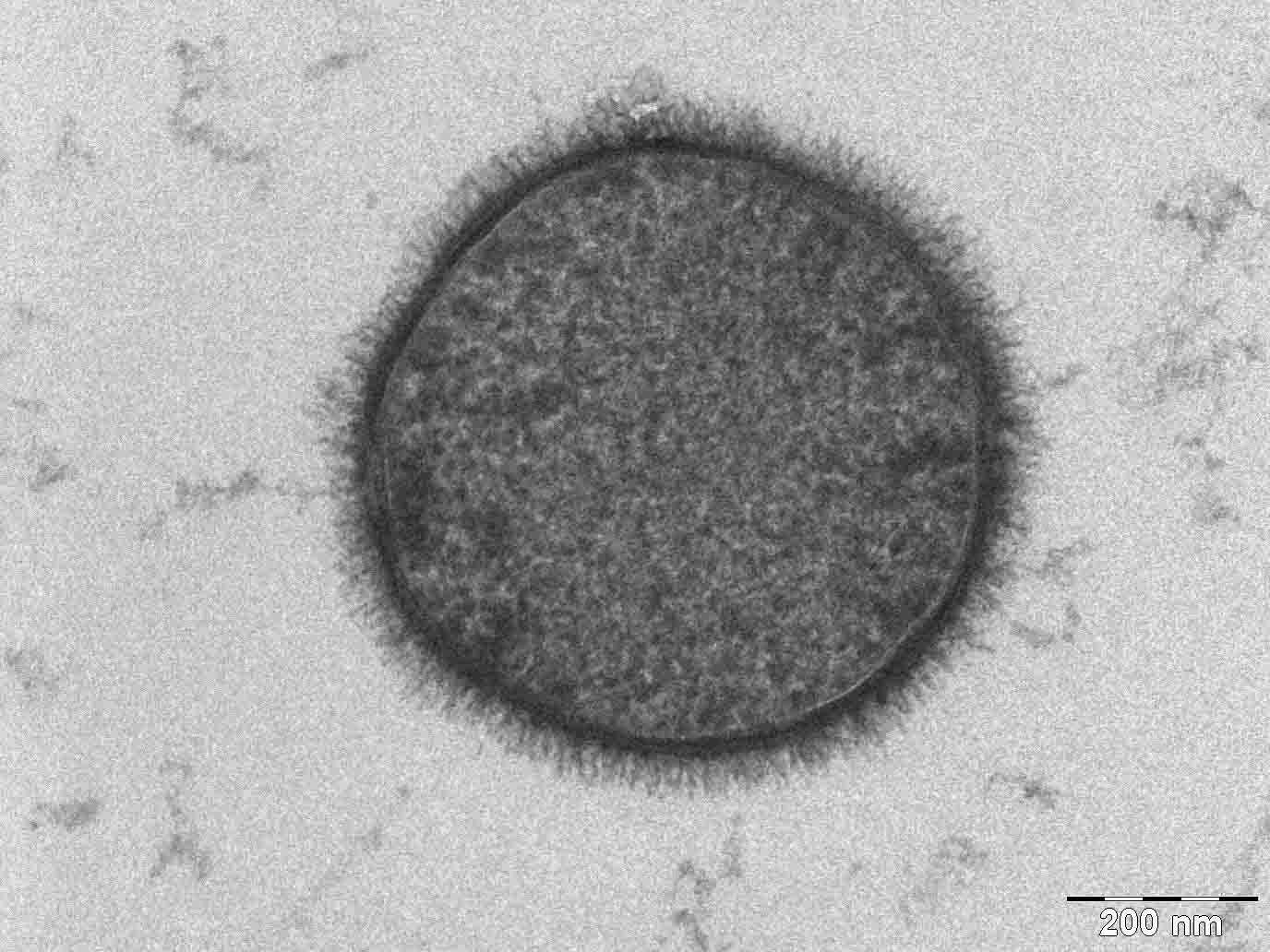
- TEM micrograph of a B. subtilis bacterium, with the hair-like glycocalyx visibly surrounding the cell membrane (scale bar = 200 nm)

Identifiers
- MeSH: D019276
- TH: H1.00.01.1.00002
- FMA: 66838

The glycocalyx (pl.: glycocalyces or glycocalyxes), also referred to as the pericellular matrix and cell coat, is an external organelle consisting of a layer of glycosylated biomolecules called glycoconjugates (such as glycoproteins and glycolipids). These are embedded in, and extend outwards from, the cell membranes of virtually all cells. Generally, the carbohydrate portion of the glycolipids found on the surface of plasma membranes helps these molecules contribute to cell–cell recognition, communication, and intercellular adhesion.

The glycocalyx is a type of identifier the body uses to distinguish between its own healthy cells and transplanted tissues, diseased cells, or invading organisms. Included in the glycocalyx are cell-adhesion molecules that enable cells to adhere to each other and guide the movement of cells during embryonic development. The glycocalyx plays a major role in regulation of endothelial vascular tissue, including the modulation of red blood cell volume in capillaries.

The term was initially applied to the polysaccharide matrix coating epithelial cells, known as mucins, but its functions have been discovered to go well beyond that.

== In vascular endothelial tissue ==
The glycocalyx is located on the apical surface of vascular endothelial cells which line the lumen, and is termed the endothelial glycocalyx. When vessels are stained with cationic dyes such as Alcian blue stain, transmission electron microscopy shows a small, irregularly shaped layer extending approximately 50–100 nm into the lumen of a blood vessel. Another study used osmium tetroxide staining during freeze substitution, and showed that the endothelial glycocalyx could be up to 11 μm thick. It is present throughout a diverse range of microvascular beds (capillaries) and macrovessels (arteries and veins). The glycocalyx also consists of a wide range of enzymes and proteins that regulate leukocyte and thrombocyte adherence, since its principal role in the vasculature is to maintain plasma and vessel-wall homeostasis. These enzymes and proteins include:

- Endothelial nitric oxide synthase (endothelial NOS)
- Extracellular superoxide dismutase (SOD3)
- Angiotensin converting enzyme
- Antithrombin-III
- Lipoprotein lipase
- Apolipoproteins
- Growth factors
- Chemokines

The enzymes and proteins listed above serve to reinforce the glycocalyx barrier against vascular and other diseases. Another main function of the glycocalyx within the vascular endothelium is shielding the vascular walls from direct exposure to blood flow, while serving as a vascular permeability barrier. Its protective functions are universal throughout the vascular system, but its relative importance varies depending on its exact location in the vasculature. In microvascular tissue, the glycocalyx serves as a vascular permeability barrier by inhibiting coagulation and leukocyte adhesion. Leukocytes must not stick to the vascular wall because they are important components of the immune system that must be able to travel to a specific region of the body when needed. In arterial vascular tissue, the glycocalyx also inhibits coagulation and leukocyte adhesion, but through mediation of nitric oxide release. Another protective function throughout the cardiovascular system is its ability to affect the filtration of interstitial fluid from capillaries into the interstitial space.

The glycocalyx, which is located on the apical surface surface of endothelial cells, is composed of a negatively charged network of proteoglycans, glycoproteins, and glycolipids. Along the luminal surface of the vascular glycocalyx exists an empty layer that excludes red blood cells.

== Disruption and disease ==
Because the glycocalyx is so prominent throughout the cardiovascular system, disruption to this structure has detrimental effects that can cause disease. Certain stimuli that cause atheroma may lead to enhanced sensitivity of vasculature. Initial dysfunction of the glycocalyx can be caused by hyperglycemia or oxidized low-density lipoproteins (LDLs), which then causes atherothrombosis. In microvasculature, dysfunction of the glycocalyx leads to internal fluid imbalance, and potentially edema. In arterial vascular tissue, glycocalyx disruption causes inflammation and atherothrombosis.

Experiments have been performed to test precisely how the glycocalyx can be altered or damaged. One particular study used an isolated perfused heart model designed to facilitate detection of the state of the vascular barrier portion, and sought to cause insult-induced shedding of the glycocalyx to ascertain the cause-and-effect relationship between glycocalyx shedding and vascular permeability. Hypoxic perfusion of the glycocalyx was thought to be sufficient to initiate a degradation mechanism of the endothelial barrier. The study found that flow of oxygen throughout the blood vessels did not have to be completely absent (ischemic hypoxia), but that minimal levels of oxygen were sufficient to cause the degradation. Shedding of the glycocalyx can be triggered by inflammatory stimuli, such as tumor necrosis factor-alpha. Whatever the stimulus is, however, shedding of the glycocalyx leads to a drastic increase in vascular permeability. Vascular walls being permeable is disadvantageous, since that would enable passage of some macromolecules or other harmful antigens.

Other sources of damage to the endothelial glycocalyx have been observed in several pathological conditions such as inflammation, hyperglycemia, ischemia-reperfusion, viral infections and sepsis.

Some key components of the glycocalyx such as syndecans, heparan sulphate, chondroitin sulphate and hyaluronan can be shed of the endothelial layer by enzymes. Hyaluronidase, hepararanse/heparinase, matrix and membrane-type matrix metalloproteases, thrombin, plasmin and elastase are some examples of enzymes that can induce shedding of the glycocalyx and these sheddases can therefor contribute to degradation of the glycocalyx layer in several pathological conditions. Research shows that plasma hyaluronidase activity is decreased in experimental as well as in clinical septic shock and is therefore not considered to be a sheddase in sepsis. Concomitant, the endogenous plasma inhibition of hyaluronidase is increased and could serve as a protection against glycocalyx shedding.

Fluid shear stress is also a potential problem if the glycocalyx is degraded for any reason. This type of frictional stress is caused by the movement of viscous fluid (i.e. blood) along the lumen boundary. Another similar experiment was carried out to determine what kinds of stimuli cause fluid shear stress. The initial measurement was taken with intravital microscopy, which showed a slow-moving plasma layer, the glycocalyx, of 1 μm thick. Light dye damaged the glycocalyx minimally, but that small change increased capillary hematocrit. Thus, fluorescence light microscopy should not be used to study the glycocalyx because that particular method uses a dye. The glycocalyx can also be reduced in thickness when treated with oxidized LDL. These stimuli, along with many other factors, can cause damage to the delicate glycocalyx. These studies are evidence that the glycocalyx plays a crucial role in cardiovascular system health.

== In bacteria and nature ==
The glycocalyx exists in bacteria as either a capsule or a slime layer. Item 6 points at the glycocalyx. The difference between a capsule and a slime layer is that in a capsule polysaccharides are firmly attached to the cell wall, while in a slime layer, the glycoproteins are loosely attached to the cell wall.

A glycocalyx, literally meaning "sugar coat" (glykys = sweet, kalyx = husk), is a network of polysaccharides that project from cellular surfaces of bacteria, which classifies it as a universal surface component of a bacterial cell, found just outside the bacterial cell wall. A distinct, gelatinous glycocalyx is called a capsule, whereas an irregular, diffuse layer is called a slime layer. This coat is extremely hydrated and stains with ruthenium red.

Bacteria growing in natural ecosystems, such as in soil, bovine intestines, or the human urinary tract, are surrounded by some sort of glycocalyx-enclosed microcolony. It serves to protect the bacterium from harmful phagocytes by creating capsules or allowing the bacterium to attach itself to inert surfaces, such as teeth or rocks, via biofilms (e.g. Streptococcus pneumoniae attaches itself to either lung cells, prokaryotes, or other bacteria which can fuse their glycocalices to envelop the colony).

== In the digestive tract ==
A glycocalyx can also be found on the apical portion of microvilli within the digestive tract, especially within the small intestine. It creates a meshwork 0.3 μm thick and consists of acidic mucopolysaccharides and glycoproteins that project from the apical plasma membrane of epithelial absorptive cells. It provides additional surface for adsorption and includes enzymes secreted by the absorptive cells that are essential for the final steps of digestion of proteins and sugars.

== Other generalized functions ==
- Protection: Cushions the plasma membrane and protects it from chemical injury
- Immunity to infection: Enables the immune system to recognize and selectively attack foreign organisms
- Defense against cancer: Changes in the glycocalyx of cancerous cells enable the immune system to recognize and destroy them.
- Transplant compatibility: Forms the basis for compatibility of blood transfusions, tissue grafts, and organ transplants
- Cell adhesion: Binds cells together so that tissues do not fall apart
- Inflammation regulation: Glycocalyx coating on endothelial walls in blood vessels prevents leukocytes from rolling/binding in healthy states.
- Fertilization: Enables sperm to recognize and bind to eggs
- Embryonic development: Guides embryonic cells to their destinations in the body

== See also ==
- Perineuronal net
