= DRSP =

DRSP may refer to:

- Drug-resistant Streptococcus pneumoniae: A type of bacteria that they cause pneumonia
- Drospirenone
