= C21H28N2O2 =

The molecular formula C_{21}H_{28}N_{2}O_{2} may refer to:

- Ibogaline, an alkaloid found in Tabernanthe iboga
- Optochin, a derivative of hydroquinine
