= HLA-A9 =

Human leukocyte antigen serotype

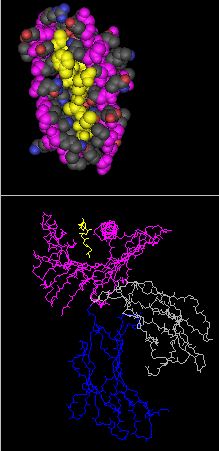
Crystal Structure Of HlA-A2402 Complexed with a telomerase peptide PDB: 2BCK rendered with Cn3D!,space filling. Top panel - top down view of peptide (yellow) and HLA-A24 residues within 7 Angstroms of peptide. Bottom panel- side view peptide backbone with no side chains, peptide yellow, HLA-A magenta-blue, B2-microglobulin grey

HLA-A9 (A9) is a broad antigen HLA-A serotype that recognized the HLA-A23 and HLA-A24 serotypes. A*2402 appears to have evolved from A*23 alleles by a process of gene conversion. The A23 is more common in Africa and regions proximal to Africa. A24 is at very high frequencies in Austronesia and certain indigenous peoples of the Arctic, North America, South America and West Pacific Rim. While it is common over most of Eurasia, it is found at low abundance in NW Europe. A24 appears to have been carried by the first colonizers of South Eastern Asia.

Subpages for A9 serotypes
Split antigen serotypes

of A9 HLA-A

HLA-A23
HLA-A24
