= HLA-A23 =

Human leukocyte antigen serotype

- (MHC Class I, A cell surface antigen)
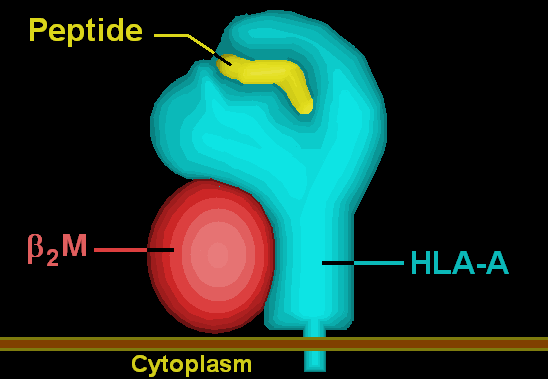
- HLA-A23

About
- Protein: transmembrane receptor/ligand
- Structure: αβ heterodimer
- Subunits: HLA-A*2301, β_{2}-microglobulin
- Older names: HL-A9

Subtypes
Subtype	allele	Available structures
A23	*2301	
- Alleles link-out to IMGT/HLA database at EBI

HLA-A23 (A23) is a human leukocyte antigen serotype within HLA-A serotype group. The serotype is determined by the antibody recognition of α^{23} subset of HLA-A α-chains. For A23, the alpha, "A", chain are encoded by the HLA-A*23 allele group and the β-chain are encoded by B2M locus. This group currently is dominated by A*2301. A23 and A*23 are almost synonymous in meaning. A23 is a split antigen of the broad antigen HLA-A9 and it is a sister serotype of HLA-A24.

A23 is common in Africa and regions of the Middle East, Mediterranean, and India than Europe, East Asia or the Americas.

== Serotype ==
A23 recognition of some HLA A*23 gene products
A*23	A23	A24	Sample
allele	%	%	size (N)
*2301	95	1	5119

== Allele ==
HLA A*2301 frequencies
- Study population: Freq. (in %)
- Mali Bandiagara: 22.8
- Cameroon Yaounde: 18.7
- Senegal Niokholo Mandenka: 17.7
- Guinea Bissau: 15.6
- Cameroon Bamileke: 14.9
- Cape Verde Southeastern I…: 14.8
- Cameroon Beti: 13.5
- Zimbabwe Harare Shona: 12.7
- USA African America: 11.1
- Portugal North: 10.9
- South African Natal Zulu: 10.0
- Cuban Mulatto: 9.5
- Tunisia: 9.4
- Kenya Luo: 8.9
- Morocco Berber Nador Meta…: 8.2
- Zambia Lusaka: 8.1
- China Beijing: 7.5
- Kenya Nandi: 7.1
- Uganda Kampala: 6.8
- Georgia Tbilisi Kurds: 6.7
- Portugal South: 6.1
- Sudanese: 5.8
- Bulgaria: 5.5
- Israel Arab Druse: 5.5
- Saudi Arabia Guraiat and …: 5.4
- Spain Catalonia Girona: 4.6
- Kenya: 4.5
- Venezuela Caracus: 4.0
- USA South Texas Hispanics: 3.9
- Mexico Mestizos: 3.7
- Russia Tuva pop 2: 2.9
- Romanian: 2.5
- Croatia: 2.3
- Brazil: 2.0
- Spain Basque Gipuzkoa Pro…: 2.0
- Australia New South Wales: 1.9
- Czech Republic: 1.9
- Georgia Tbilisi Georgian…: 1.9
- Oman: 1.7
- Belgium: 1.6
- USA North American Native…: 1.6
- China Inner Mongolia: 1.5
- India New Delhi: 1.5
- Pakistan Pathan: 1.5
- Ireland Northern: 1.4
- Jordan Amman: 1.4
- Mongolia Buriat: 1.4
- Pakistan Sindhi: 1.3
- USA Caucasian (2): 1.3
- France South East: 1.2
- Italy North Pavia: 1.2
- Iran Baloch: 1.1
- Italy Bergamo: 1.1
- France Corsica: 1.0
- India North Hindus: 1.0
- Portugal Centre: 1.0

== Haplotypes ==
A23-B7 is found in N.Afr. and S.Afr non-caucasians.
A23-B44 is found in Albania, Zimbabwe, Morocco, Spain and Danes.
A23-B58 is found in the !kung and Zaire.

=== Associated diseases ===
A*23:Cw*07 is associated with higher viral load in HIV
