= Slime layer =

Unorganized layer of extracellular material surrounding bacteria cells

A slime layer in bacteria is an easily removable (e.g. by centrifugation), unorganized layer of extracellular material that surrounds bacteria cells. Specifically, this consists mostly of exopolysaccharides, glycoproteins, and glycolipids. Therefore, the slime layer is considered as a subset of glycocalyx.

While slime layers and capsules are found most commonly in bacteria, these structures do exist in archaea as well, albeit rarely. This information about structure and function is also transferable to these microorganisms too.

== Structure ==
Slime layers are amorphous and inconsistent in thickness, being produced in various quantities depending upon the cell type and environment. These layers present themselves as strands hanging extracellularly and forming net-like structures between cells that were 1-4μm apart. Researchers suggested that a cell will slow formation of the slime layer after around 9 days of growth, perhaps due to slower metabolic activity.

A bacterial capsule is similar, but is more rigid than the slime layer. Capsules are more organized and difficult to remove compared to their slime layer counterparts. Another highly organized, but separate structure is an S-layer. S-layers are structures that integrate themselves into the cell wall and are composed of glycoproteins, these layers can offer the cell rigidity and protection. Because a slime layer is loose and flowing, it does not aide the cell in its rigidity.

While biofilms can be composed of slime layer producing bacteria, it is typically not their main composition. Rather, a biofilm is made up of an array of microorganisms that come together to form a cohesive biofilm. Although, there are homogeneous biofilms that can form. For example, the plaque that forms on the surfaces of teeth is caused by a biofilm formation of primarily Streptococcus mutans and the slow breakdown of tooth enamel.

== Cellular function ==
The function of the slime layer is to protect the bacteria cells from environmental dangers such as antibiotics and desiccation. The slime layer allows bacteria to adhere to smooth surfaces such as prosthetic implants and catheters, as well as other smooth surfaces like petri-dishes. Researchers found that the cells adhered themselves to the culture vessel without additional appendages, relying on the extracellular material alone.

While consisting mostly of polysaccharides, a slime layer may be over produced such that in a time of famine the cell can rely on the slime layer as extra food storage to survive. In addition, a slime layer may be produced in ground dwelling prokaryotes to prevent unnecessary drying due to annual temperature and humidity shifts.

It may permit bacterial colonies to survive chemical sterilization with chlorine, iodine, and other chemicals, leaving autoclaving or flushing with boiling water as the only certain methods of decontaminating.

Some bacteria have shown a protective response to attacks from the immune system by using their slime layers to absorb antibodies. Additionally, some bacteria like Pseudomonas aeruginosa and Bacillus anthracis can produce biofilm structures that are effective against phagocyte attacks from the host immune system. This type of biofilm formation increases their virulence factor as they are more likely to survive within a host's body, although this type of biofilm is typically associated with capsules.

== Research ==
Because of the abundance of so many bacteria that are increasing their resistance to antimicrobial agents such as antibiotics (these products inhibit cell growth or just kill the cell), there is new research coming out about new drugs that reduce virulence factors in some bacteria. Anti-virulent drugs reduce the pathogenic properties in bacteria, allowing the host to attack said bacteria, or allows antimicrobial agents to work. Staphylococcus aureus is a pathogenic bacteria that causes several human infections with a plethora of virulence factors such as: biofilm formation, quorum sensing, and exotoxins to name a few. Researchers took a look at Myricetin (Myr) as a multi-anti-virulence agent against S.areus and how it specifically impacts biofilm formation. After regular dosing it was found that biofilm formation decreased and the number of adhered cells on their specified media decreased without killing the cells. Myr is promising when surfaces are coated in the material, non-coated surfaces show a thick biofilm formation with a large quantity of cellular adherence; the coated material showed minimal cell clusters that were weakly adhered.

A problem with concrete structures is the damage they receive during weather shifts, because if its porous nature there is an amount of water that can expand or contract the concrete depending on the environment. This damage makes these structures susceptible to sulfate attacks. Sulfate attacks occur when the sulfates in the concrete react to other salts formed by other sulfate sources and cause internal erosion of the concrete. The extra exposure to these sulfate (SO_{4}) ions can be caused by road salt getting splashed onto the structure, soils that are high in sulfates are also an issue for these concrete structures. Research has shown that some aerobic slime forming bacteria may be able to help repair and maintain concrete structures. These bacteria act as a diffusion barrier from the external sulfates to the concrete. Researchers found that the thicker the layer the more effective it was, seeing almost a linear increase for the number of service years applicable to the concrete structure as the layer thickness increased. For long term repair of the structure, 60mm thickness of the slime layer should be used to ensure the longevity of the concrete structure, and to ensure the proper diffusion of sulfate ions.
