= Streptococcus parasanguinis =

Scientific classification
- Domain: Bacteria
- Kingdom: Bacillati
- Phylum: Bacillota
- Class: Bacilli
- Order: Lactobacillales
- Family: Streptococcaceae
- Genus: Streptococcus
- Species: S. parasanguinis

Binomial name
- Streptococcus parasanguinis corrig. Whiley et al. 1990

Species of bacterium

Streptococcus parasanguinis is a gram-positive bacterium of the genus Streptococcus that is classified as a member of the Streptococcus viridans group. S. parasanguinis is one of the major early colonizers of dental surfaces in the human oral cavity. Cell surface structures including pili and fimbriae allow the bacteria to adhere to oral surfaces. These adhesion molecules also play an important role in biofilm formation and promote aggregation with late tooth colonizers to form dental plaque. The presence of S. parasanguinis in the oral cavity is associated with a healthy microflora.
