= HLA-A24 =

Human leukocyte antigen serotype

- (MHC Class I, A cell surface antigen)
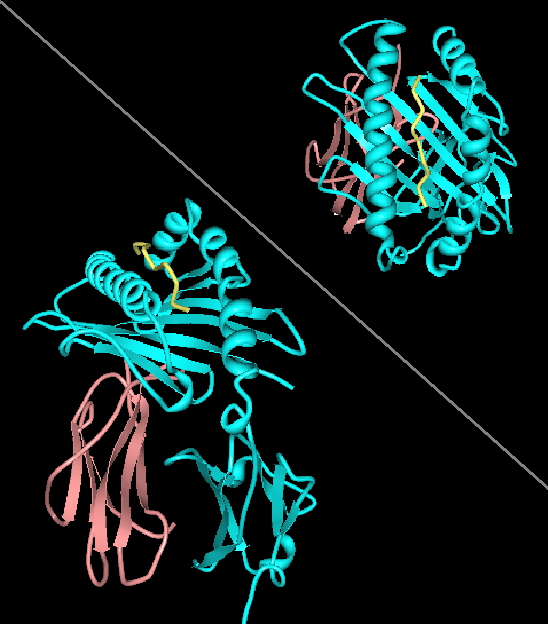
- Rendering of 2bck: α (A*2402 gene product), β_{2}-microglobulin, and telomerase peptide.

About
- Protein: transmembrane receptor/ligand
- Structure: αβ heterodimer
- Subunits: HLA-A*24--, β_{2}-microglobulin
- Older names: HL-A9

Subtypes
Subtype	allele	Available structures
A24	*2402	2bck
A9.3	*2403	
- Alleles link-out to IMGT/HLA database at EBI

HLA-A24 (A24) is a human leukocyte antigen serotype within HLA-A serotype group. The serotype is determined by the antibody recognition of α^{24} subset of HLA-A α-chains. For A24, the alpha, "A", chain are encoded by the HLA-A*24 allele group and the β-chain are encoded by B2M locus. This group currently is dominated by A*24:02. A24 and A*24 are almost synonymous in meaning. A24 is a split antigen of the broad antigen HLA-A9 and it is a sister serotype of HLA-A23.

A*24:02 has one of the highest "A" frequencies identified for a number of peoples, including Papua New Guineans, Indigenous Taiwanese (Eastern Tribals), Yupik and Greenland [Aleuts]. It is common over much of Southeastern Asia. In Eurasia it is least common in Ireland, and A24 is relatively uncommon in Africa except North Africa and Kenya.

== Serotype ==
A24 recognition of some HLA A*24 gene products
A*24	A24	A9	Sample
allele	%	%	size (N)
*24:02	97		3098
*24:03	55	4	282

There are over 90 known A*24 alleles, 69 code for different isoforms and 7 are nulls. A*24:03 can also be detected as A2403 serotype.

=== Associated disease ===
A24 has a secondary risk factor for myasthenia gravis, Buerger's disease. It is also associated with Type 1 Diabetes (T1D) and systemic lupus erythematosus (SLE).

=== Alleles ===
HLA A*2402 frequencies
- Study population: Freq. (in %)
- Taiwan Paiwan: 86.3
- Taiwan Tsou: 78.4
- Taiwan Rukai: 76.0
- Papua New Guinea Goroka: 74.4
- PNG Karimui Plateau: 74.4
- Taiwan Puyuma: 64.0
- Taiwan Ami: 62.8
- PNG Wanigela: 62.7
- Taiwan Atayal: 61.8
- Ecuador Cayapa: 61.4
- New Caledonia: 60.7
- Venezuela Perja Mtn. Bari: 60.2
- USA Alaska Yupik Natives: 58.1
- Taiwan Tao: 54.0
- PNG Wosera: 51.3
- Taiwan Siraya: 47.1
- Taiwan Taroko: 44.5
- Mexico Chihuahua Tarahuma…: 37.5
- USA Arizona Pima: 36.0
- Taiwan Pazeh: 33.6
- Japan Okinawa Ryukyuan: 33.5
- American Samoa: 33.0
- Japan (5): 32.7
- Philippines Ivatan: 32.0
- PNG New Britain Rabaul: 31.6
- N. Mexico Canoncito Navaj…: 30.5
- Australia Indig. Yuendumu: 29.8
- Australia Indig. Groote E…: 29.3
- China Tibetans: 27.2
- S. Dakota Lakota Sioux: 26.2
- Mexico Mixtec Oaxaca: 24.5
- Japan Ainu Hokkaido: 24.0
- Venezuela Perija Mtns. Yu…: 23.3
- Mexico Zaptotec Oaxaca: 23.1
- USA North American Native…: 22.7
- Australia Indig. Cape Yor…: 22.3
- Ch. Guangdong Meizhou Han: 22.2
- Russia Tuva (2): 21.5
- Singapore Chinese Han: 21.5
- India North Hindus: 20.2
- Mongolia Buriat: 20.0
- China Inner Mongolia: 19.6
- USA Asian: 18.9
- Taiwan Minnan (1): 18.6
- China South Han: 17.2
- Georgia Tbilisi Georgian…: 17.1
- India Mumbai Marathas: 16.7
- Mexico Guadalajara Mestiz…: 16.5
- Singapore Riau Malay: 16.5
- Croatia: 16.0
- India Khandesh Pawra: 16.0
- Singapore Javanese Indone…: 16.0
- South Africa Natal Tamil: 16.0
- India Tamil Nadu Nadar: 15.6
- PNG Madang: 15.3
- China North Han: 15.2
- USA South Texas Hispanics: 15.2
- PNG West Schrader Ranges: 14.2
- China Guangxi Maonan: 13.4
- Mexico Mestizos: 13.4
- Georgia Svaneti Svans: 13.1
- Romanian: 12.7
- Pakistan Burusho: 12.5
- USA Hispanic: 12.2
- Bulgaria: 11.8
- Georgia Tbilisi Kurds: 11.7
- India New Delhi: 11.4
- Pakistan Sindhi: 10.7
- USA Caucasian: 10.7
- France South East: 10.6
- Pakistan Pathan: 10.2
- Cameroon Pygmy Baka: 10.0
- Finland: 9.4
- Brazil: 8.6
- Australia Indig. Kimberly: 8.3
- Australia New South Wales: 8.2
- Israel Arab Druse: 8.0
- Pakistan Baloch: 8.0
- Portugal Centre: 8.0
- Cameroon Sawa: 7.7
- Brazil Terena: 7.5
- Ireland South: 6.8
- Tunisia: 6.7
- Belgium: 6.6
- Morocco Berber Nador Meta…: 6.2
- Jordan Amman: 5.9
- Oman: 5.9
- Mexico Mixe Oaxaca: 5.7
- Portugal North: 5.4
- Sudanese: 5.3
- Mexico Sonora Seri: 4.5
- Uganda Kampala: 4.3
- Thailand: 3.9
- Iran Baloch: 3.4
- USA African America: 2.8
- Kenya: 2.1
- Guinea Bissau: 1.5
- Czech Republic: 1.0
- Kenya Nandi: 1.0

A*24:02 is a secondary risk factor, alters type 1 diabetes risk, and allele associated with thymoma-induced myasthenia gravis.

== Haplotypes ==
HLA A24-B35 haplotype by Cw frequencies
		freq		Rank in
ref.	Population	(%)		Pop.
	Java (Indonesia)	8.0	^{1}	4
	S. Amer. Native	6.3	^{1}	3
	N. Amer. Native	5.4	^{1}	5
	Mexican	4.7	^{1}
	Inuit	4.2	^{1}
	Brazilian	3.8	^{1}
	Austria	3.5	^{1}
	Portuguese	3.1	^{1}	3
	Yakut	2.9	^{1}
	Mongolian	2.7	^{1}
	Timor	2.5	^{1}	5
	Bharghavas (India)	2.4	^{1}
	Greek	2.3	^{1}
	Italian	2.2	^{1}
	Mongolian	1.9	^{1}
	Vietnamese	1.8	^{1}
	Japanese	1.6	^{2}
	French	1.2	^{2}
^{1} Cw4. ^{2} Cw9.

A24-Cw7-B39
A24-Cw10-B60
A24-Cw10-B61
A24-B48

=== A24-Cw4-B35 ===
This particular haplotype is common across a fairly wide region, possibly the most widely spread A-Cw-B haplotype in humans. Cw4-B35 has a node within the region once referred to as Thracia/Dacia.

=== A24-Cw*14-B51 ===
HLA A24-CBL-B51 (CBL=1402) haplotype frequencies
		freq
ref.	Population	(%)
	Korean	3.5
	Iyers	3.4
	Mongolian	2.9
	Japanese	2.6
	Romanian	2.2
	Greek	2.1
	Hungarian	2.0
	Italian	0.6
