= Quellung reaction =

Reaction in which antibodies bind to bacterial capsule

The quellung reaction, also called the Neufeld reaction, is a biochemical reaction in which antibodies bind to the bacterial capsule of Streptococcus pneumoniae, Klebsiella pneumoniae, Neisseria meningitidis, Bacillus anthracis, Haemophilus influenzae, Escherichia coli, and Salmonella. The antibody reaction allows these species to be visualized under a microscope. If the reaction is positive, the capsule becomes opaque and appears to enlarge.

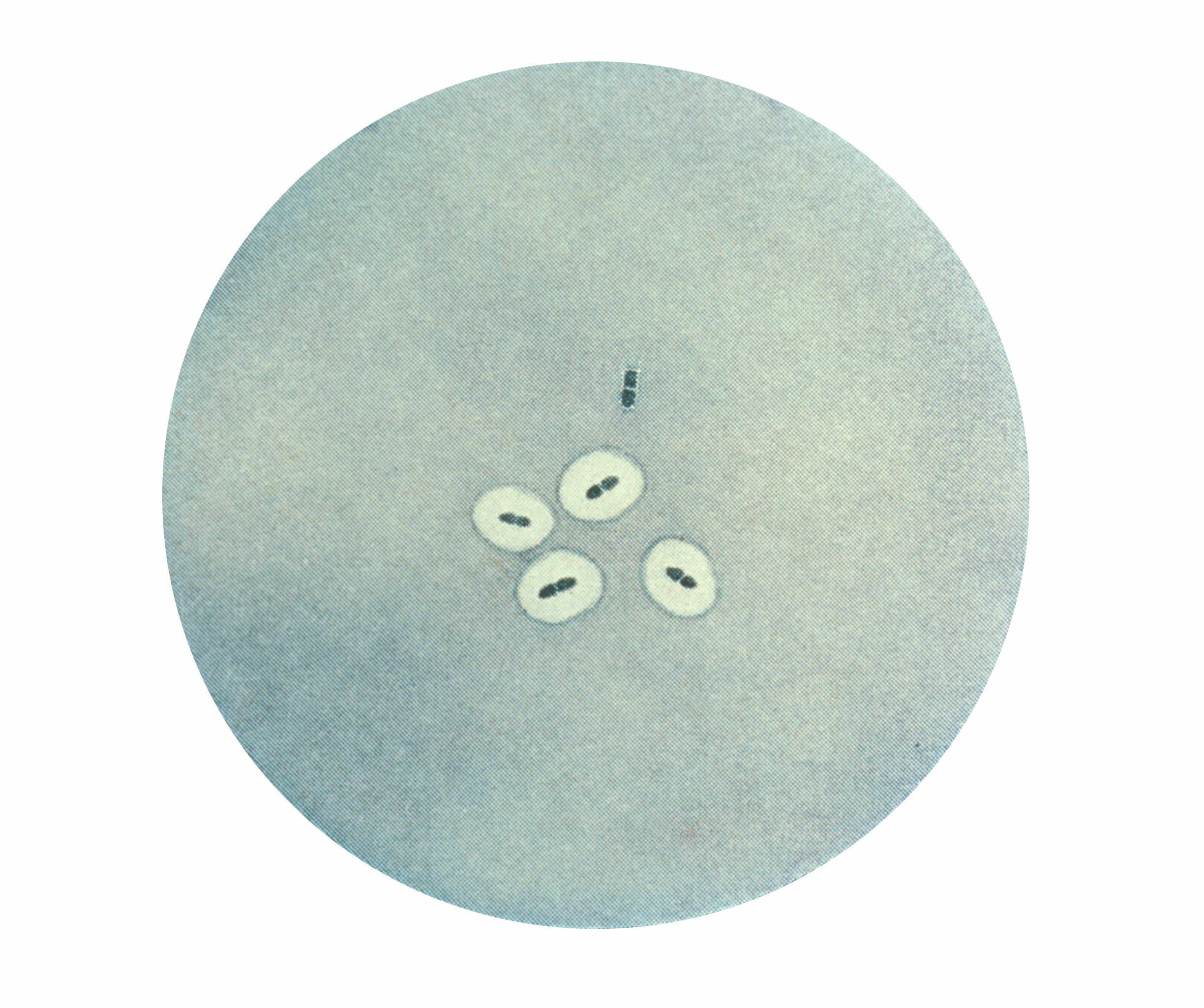
Photomicrograph of Streptococcus pneumoniae bacteria revealing capsular swelling using the Neufeld quellung test. Notice the two streptococci at the top of the photo that appear to have no capsule.

Quellung is the German word for "swelling" and describes the microscopic appearance of pneumococcal or other bacterial capsules after their polysaccharide antigen has combined with a specific antibody. The antibody usually comes from serum taken from an immunized laboratory animal. As a result of this combination, and precipitation of the large, complex molecule formed, the capsule appears to swell, because of increased surface tension, and its outlines become demarcated.

The pneumococcal quellung reaction was first described in 1902 by the scientist Fred Neufeld, and applied only to Streptococcus pneumoniae, both as microscopic capsular swelling and macroscopic agglutination (clumping visible with the naked eye). It was initially an intellectual curiosity more than anything else, and could distinguish only the three pneumococcal serotypes known at that time. However, it acquired an important practical use with the advent of serum therapy to treat certain types of pneumococcal pneumonia in the 1920s because selection of the proper antiserum to treat an individual patient required correct identification of the infecting pneumococcal serotype, and the quellung reaction was the only method available to do this. Dr. Albert Sabin made modifications to Neufeld's technique so that it could be done more rapidly, and other scientists expanded the technique to identify 29 additional serotypes.

Application of Neufeld's discoveries to other important areas of research came when Fred Griffith showed that pneumococci could transfer information to transform one serotype into another. Oswald Avery, Colin MacLeod, and Maclyn McCarty later showed that the transforming factor was deoxyribonucleic acid, or DNA.

Serum therapy for infectious diseases was displaced by antibiotics in the 1940s, but identification of specific serotypes remained important as the understanding of the epidemiology of pneumococcal infections still required their identification to determine where different serotypes spread, as well as the variable invasiveness of different serotypes. Understanding the prevalence of various serotypes was also critical to the development of pneumococcal vaccines to prevent invasive infections.

The quellung reaction has been used to identify the 93 known capsular serotypes of Streptococcus pneumoniae in diagnostic settings, but in recent years it has been challenged by the latex agglutination method, and further by molecular typing techniques such as the polymerase chain reaction, which detect DNA and therefore target genetic differences between serotypes. Currently, there are >100 known capsular serotypes.
