= Pneumolysin =

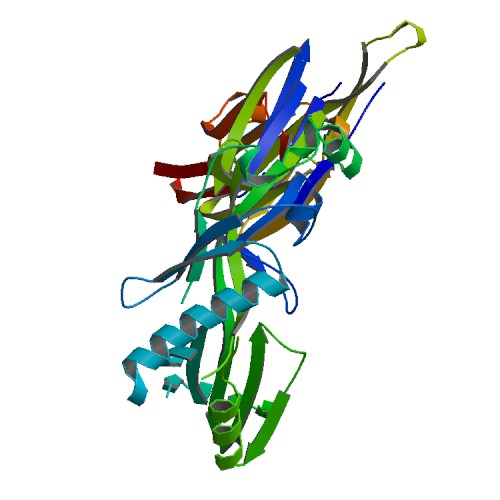
3D structure of pneumolysin

Pneumolysin is a virulence factor of the Gram-positive bacteria Streptococcus pneumoniae.

It is a pore-forming toxin of 53 kDa composed of 471 amino acids. It has a range of biological activity, including the ability to lyse and interfere with the function of cells and soluble molecules of the immune system.

Released pneumolysin will aid the bacteria during colonization by facilitating adherence to the host, during invasion by damaging host cells and during infection by interfering with the host immune response.

The presence of pneumolysin in sputum, urine, CSF and blood can be indicative of an S. pneumoniae infection.
