= Nemonoxacin =

Names
- Preferred IUPAC name 7-[(3S,5S)-3-Amino-5-methylpiperidin-1-yl]-1-cyclopropyl-8-methoxy-4-oxo-1,4-dihydroquinoline-3-carboxylic acid

Identifiers
CAS Number	378746-64-6
3D model (JSmol)	Interactive image
ChEBI	CHEBI:136053
ChEMBL	ChEMBL1213456
ChemSpider	10166207
DrugBank	DB06600
IUPHAR/BPS	10836
PubChem CID	11993740
UNII	P94L0PVO94
CompTox Dashboard (EPA)	DTXSID10958907
- InChI: InChI=1S/C20H25N3O4/c1-11-7-12(21)9-22(8-11)16-6-5-14-17(19(16)27-2)23(13-3-4-13)10-15(18(14)24)20(25)26/h5-6,10-13H,3-4,7-9,21H2,1-2H3,(H,25,26)/t11-,12-/m0/s1 Key: AVPQPGFLVZTJOR-RYUDHWBXSA-N; InChI=1/C20H25N3O4/c1-11-7-12(21)9-22(8-11)16-6-5-14-17(19(16)27-2)23(13-3-4-13)10-15(18(14)24)20(25)26/h5-6,10-13H,3-4,7-9,21H2,1-2H3,(H,25,26)/t11-,12-/m0/s1 Key: AVPQPGFLVZTJOR-RYUDHWBXBZ
- SMILES: C[C@H]1C[C@H](N)CN(C1)c2ccc3c(c2OC)n(C4CC4)cc(c3=O)C(=O)O

Properties
Chemical formula	C_{20}H_{25}N_{3}O_{4}
Molar mass	371.437 g·mol^{−1}

Pharmacology
ATC code	J01MB08 (WHO)
- Except where otherwise noted, data are given for materials in their standard state (at 25 °C [77 °F], 100 kPa). Infobox references

Nemonoxacin is a non-fluorinated quinolone antibiotic undergoing clinical trials. It has the same mechanism of action as fluouroquinolones; it inhibits DNA gyrase, preventing DNA synthesis, gene duplication, and cell division. At the end of 2016, it had reached market in Taiwan, Russia, the Commonwealth Independent States, Turkey, mainland China, and Latin America under the brand name Taigexyn. Nemonoxacin has completed phase 2 trials in the US and has moved on to phase 3 trials. The U.S. Food and Drug Administration (FDA) has granted nemonoxacin qualified infectious disease product (QIDP) and fast track designations for community-acquired bacterial pneumonia (CAP) and acute bacterial skin and skin-structure infections (ABSSSI).

Nemonoxacin has a broad spectrum of activity against Gram-positive, Gram-negative, and atypical pathogens, including activity against methicillin-resistant Staphylococcus aureus (MRSA) (MIC90 1 μg/ml) and vancomycin-resistant pathogens. However, it was less active against Gram-negative pathogens such as Escherichia coli, Proteus mirabilis, and Pseudomonas aeruginosa, with MIC90 values of 32, 16, and 32 μg/ml, respectively. The new drug also is effective against C.difficile isolates that are resistant to other quinolones, and is more potent than levofloxacin or moxifloxacin.
