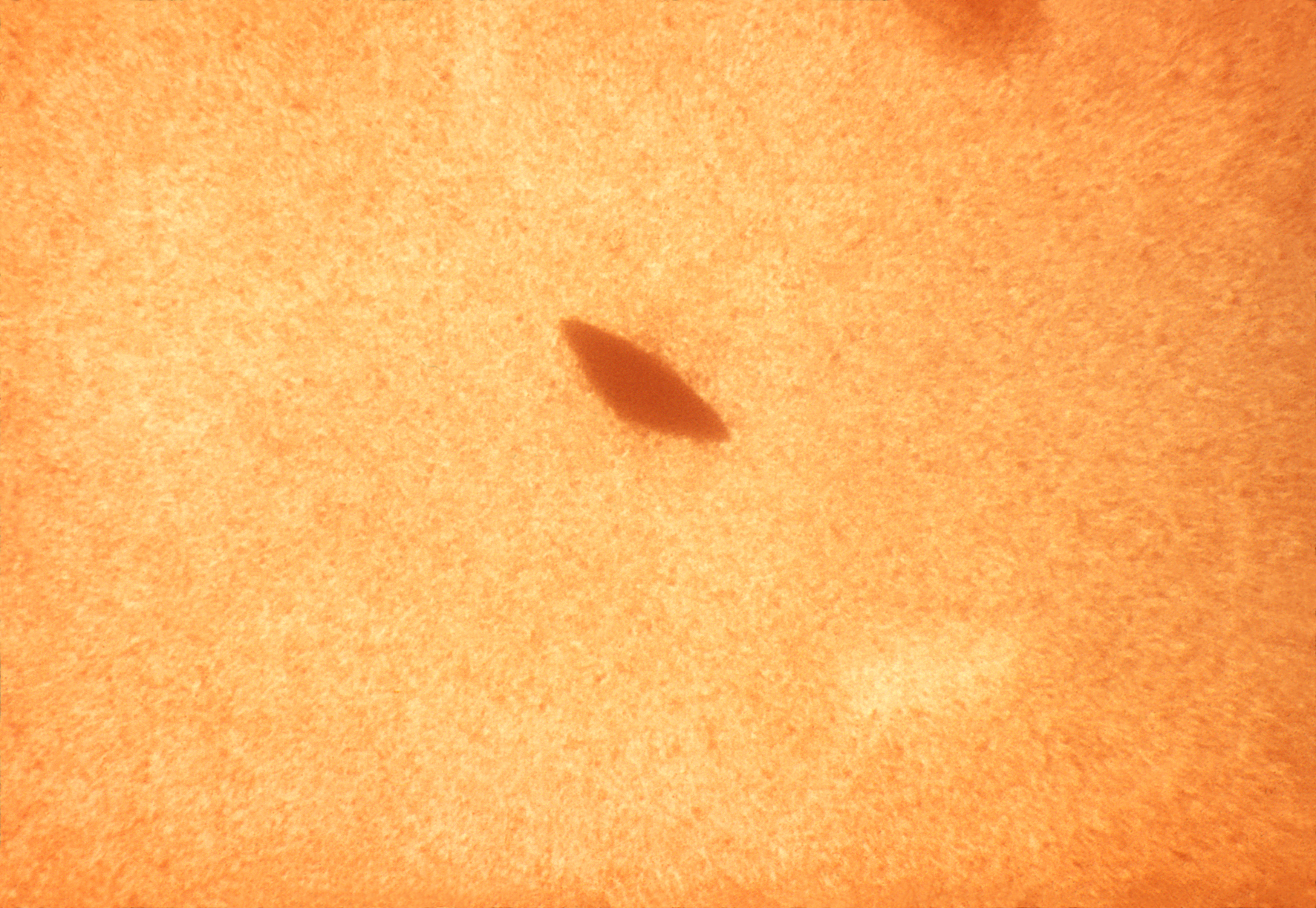
- Colony of Streptococcus salivarius on blood agar

Scientific classification
- Domain: Bacteria
- Kingdom: Bacillati
- Phylum: Bacillota
- Class: Bacilli
- Order: Lactobacillales
- Family: Streptococcaceae
- Genus: Streptococcus
- Species: S. salivarius

Binomial name
- Streptococcus salivarius Andrewes & Horder 1906

Synonyms
- Streptococcus salivarius subsp. thermophilus Andrewes & Horder 1906

= Streptococcus salivarius =

Species of bacterium

Streptococcus salivarius is a species of spherical, gram-positive, facultative anaerobic lactic acid bacteria that is both catalase and oxidase negative. S. salivarius colonizes (usually in chains) the oral cavity and upper respiratory tract of humans just a few hours after birth, making further exposure to the bacteria harmless in most circumstances. The bacterium is considered an opportunistic pathogen, rarely finding its way into the bloodstream, where it has been implicated in cases of sepsis in people with neutropenia, (a deficiency in white blood cells).

== Characteristics ==
S. salivarius has distinct characteristics when exposed to different environmental nutrients. For example, in the laboratory, if a growth medium is used that includes sucrose then S. salivarius is able to use the sucrose to produce a capsule around itself. However, if sucrose is replaced by glucose as on a GYC (glucose, yeast extract, calcium carbonate) plate, S. salivarius is unable to make a capsule from the glucose.

More importantly, in the laboratory, S. salivarius can show a distinct clearing on GYC plates. This is because S. salivarius can ferment the glucose yielding lactic acid. Next, the lactic acid reacts with the calcium carbonate in the GYC plate, resulting in zones of clearings on the plate.

== Role as a probiotic ==
Some strains of S. salivarius are being trialed for their use as a probiotic in the prevention of oral infections. Some strains of S. salivarius are found to produce BLIS (Bacteriocin-like Inhibitory Substances) which are antimicrobial peptides. These peptides display interspecies inhibition, and inhibit Streptococcus pyogenes (which causes strep throat infections). Lozenges containing S. salivarius are marketed to support immunity against more virulent Streptococcus strains. People with this strain of naturally occurring S. salivarius on their tongue have been shown to have fewer Strep throat infections. This is also being investigated for its potential to prevent rheumatic heart disease which is also caused by S. pyogenes.

Agglutination of Streptococcus salivarius is often used in the diagnosis of atypical pneumonia caused by Haemophilus influenzae

== Subspecies ==
Streptococcus thermophilus was originally described as a subspecies of this entry, Streptococcus salivarius subsp. thermophilus. It has since been promoted to the species rank. The FastANI metric used by GTDB concurs with this decision.
