= Optochin =

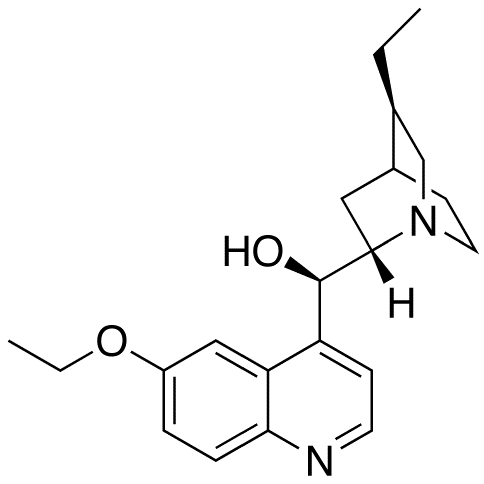

Names
- IUPAC name (4β,8α,9R)-6'-Ethoxy-10,11-dihydrocinchonan-9-ol
- Other names Ethylhydrocupreine

Identifiers
CAS Number	522-60-1
3D model (JSmol)	Interactive image
ChEBI	CHEBI:86455
ChEMBL	ChEMBL534999
ChemSpider	79283
ECHA InfoCard	100.007.577
MeSH	Optochin
PubChem CID	71542
UNII	4W030VS2OG
CompTox Dashboard (EPA)	DTXSID50893924
- InChI: InChI=1S/C21H28N2O2/c1-3-14-13-23-10-8-15(14)11-20(23)21(24)17-7-9-22-19-6-5-16(25-4-2)12-18(17)19/h5-7,9,12,14-15,20-21,24H,3-4,8,10-11,13H2,1-2H3/t14-,15-,20-,21+/m0/s1 Key: SUWZHLCNFQWNPE-LATRNWQMSA-N; InChI=1/C21H28N2O2/c1-3-14-13-23-10-8-15(14)11-20(23)21(24)17-7-9-22-19-6-5-16(25-4-2)12-18(17)19/h5-7,9,12,14-15,20-21,24H,3-4,8,10-11,13H2,1-2H3/t14-,15-,20-,21+/m0/s1 Key: SUWZHLCNFQWNPE-LATRNWQMBV
- SMILES: CC[C@H]1CN2CC[C@H]1C[C@H]2[C@@H](c3ccnc4c3cc(cc4)OCC)O

Properties
Chemical formula	C_{21}H_{28}N_{2}O_{2}
Molar mass	340.46 g/mol
- Except where otherwise noted, data are given for materials in their standard state (at 25 °C [77 °F], 100 kPa). verify (what is ?) Infobox references

Optochin (or ethylhydrocupreine hydrochloride) is a derivative of quinine introduced in 1911 by Morgenroth and Levy with the intention to treat pneumococci infection. In very high dilutions, it inhibits the growth of representatives of all four groups of pneumococci in vitro. That is the main reason it is now used in bacteriology for the differentiation of Streptococcus pneumoniae, which is optochin-sensitive, from the other, resistant alpha-hemolytic streptococci, sometimes called the viridans streptococci because of the green colouration on blood agar around colonies.

The growth of bacteria that are optochin-sensitive will show a zone of inhibition around an optochin disc, while the growth of bacteria that are resistant to optochin will not be affected. In vitro, a minimum inhibitory concentration (MIC) of 1:10,000,000 will inhibit the growth of pneumococci, and 1:500,000 is bactericidal.

== Resistance ==
For decades, Streptococcus pneumoniae has been considered susceptible to optochin; but some strains have been found to be resistant to optochin in laboratory testing. This is notable because the emergence of optochin-resistant strains would invalidate the distinguishing test described above.

== See also ==
- Quinine
