= Serotype =

Distinct variation within a species of bacteria or virus or among immune cells

Two serotypes 1a and 1b with antigens 2a and 2b on surface, which are recognized by two distinct antibodies, 3a and 3b, respectively

A serotype or serovar is a distinct variation within a species of bacteria or virus or among immune cells of different individuals. These microorganisms, viruses, or cells are classified together based on their shared reactivity between their surface antigens and a particular antiserum, allowing the classification of organisms to a level below the species. A group of serovars with common antigens is called a serogroup or sometimes serocomplex.

Serotyping often plays an essential role in determining species and subspecies. The Salmonella genus of bacteria, for example, has been determined to have over 2600 serotypes. Vibrio cholerae, the species of bacteria that causes cholera, has over 200 serotypes, based on cell antigens. Only two of them have been observed to produce the potent enterotoxin that results in cholera: O1 and O139.

Serotypes were discovered in hemolytic streptococci by the American microbiologist Rebecca Lancefield in 1933.

== Procedure ==
Serotyping is the process of determining the serotype of an organism, using prepared antisera that bind to a set of known antigens. Some antisera detect multiple known antigens and are known as polyvalent or broad; others are monovalent. For example, what was once described as HLA-A9 is now subdivided into two more specific serotypes ("split antigens"), HLA-A23 and HLA-A24. As a result, A9 is now known as a "broad" serotype. For organisms with many possible serotypes, first obtaining a polyvalent match can reduce the number of tests required.

The binding between a surface antigen and the antiserum can be experimentally observed in many forms. A number of bacteria species, including Streptococcus pneumoniae, display the Quellung reaction visible under a microscope. Others such as Shigella (and E. coli) and Salmonella are traditionally detected using a slide agglutination test. HLA types are originally determined with the complement fixation test. Newer procedures include the latex fixation test and various other immunoassays.

"Molecular serotyping" refers to methods that replace the antibody-based test with a test based on the nucleic acid sequence – therefore actually a kind of genotyping. By analyzing which surface antigen-defining allele(s) are present, these methods can produce faster results. However, their results may not always agree with traditional serotyping, as they can fail to account for factors that affect the expression of antigen-determining genes.

== Role in organ transplantation ==
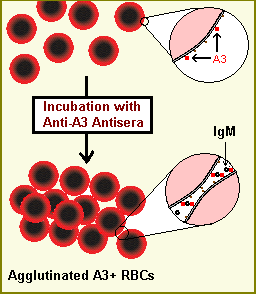
Agglutination of HLA-A3 positive red blood cells with anti-A3 alloreactive antisera containing Anti-A3 IgM

The immune system is capable of discerning a cell as being 'self' or 'non-self' according to that cell's serotype. In humans, that serotype is largely determined by human leukocyte antigen (HLA), the human version of the major histocompatibility complex. Cells determined to be non-self are usually recognized by the immune system as foreign, causing an immune response, such as hemagglutination. Serotypes differ widely between individuals; therefore, if cells from one human (or animal) are introduced into another random human, those cells are often determined to be non-self because they do not match the self-serotype. For this reason, transplants between genetically non-identical humans often induce a problematic immune response in the recipient, leading to transplant rejection. In some situations, this effect can be reduced by serotyping both recipient and potential donors to determine the closest HLA match.

=== Human leukocyte antigens ===
Serotypes according to HLA (MHC) locus
HLA Locus	# of Serotypes	Broad Antigens	Split Antigens
A	25	4	15
B	50	9	
C*	12	1	
DR	21	4	
DQ	8	2	
DP*			
*DP and many Cw require SSP-PCR for typing.

== Bacteria ==
Most bacteria produce antigenic substances on the outer surface that can be distinguished by serotyping.

- Almost all species of Gram-negative bacteria produce a layer of lipopolysaccharide on the outer membrane. The outermost portion of the LPS accessible to antibodies is the O antigen. Variation in the O antigen can be caused by genetic differences in the biosynthetic pathway or the transporter used to move the building-blocks to the outside of the cell.
- The flagella on motile bacteria is called the H antigen in serotyping. Minute genetic differences in the components of the flagella lead to variations detectable by antibodies.
- Some bacteria produce a polysaccharide capsule, called the K antigen in serotyping.

The LPS (O) and capsule (K) antigens are themselves important pathogenicity factors.

Some antigens are invariant among a taxonomic group. Presence of these antigens would not be useful for classification lower than the species level, but may inform identification. One example is the enterobacterial common antigen (ECA), universal to all Enterobacterales.

=== E. coli ===
E. coli have 187 possible O antigens (6 later removed from list, 3 actually producing no LPS), 53 H antigens, and at least 72 K antigens. Among these three, the O antigen has the best correlation with lineages; as a result, the O antigen is used to define the "serogroup" and is also used to define strains in taxonomy and epidemiology.

=== Shigella ===
Shigella are only classified by their O antigen, as they are non-motile and produce no flagella. Across the four "species", there are 15 + 11 + 20 + 2 = 48 serotypes. Some of these O antigens have equivalents in E. coli, which also cladistically include Shigella.

=== Salmonella ===
The Kauffman–White classification scheme is the basis for naming the manifold serovars of Salmonella. In August 2014, more than 2600 different serotypes have been identified. A Salmonella serotype is determined by the unique combination of reactions of cell surface antigens. For Salmonella, the O and H antigens are used. There are two species of Salmonella: Salmonella bongori and Salmonella enterica. Salmonella enterica can be subdivided into six subspecies. The process to identify the serovar of the bacterium consists of finding the formula of surface antigens which represent the variations of the bacteria. The traditional method for determining the antigen formula is agglutination reactions on slides. The agglutination between the antigen and the antibody is made with a specific antisera, which reacts with the antigen to produce a mass. The antigen O is tested with a bacterial suspension from an agar plate, whereas the antigen H is tested with a bacterial suspension from a broth culture. The scheme classifies the serovar depending on its antigen formula obtained via the agglutination reactions. Additional serotyping methods and alternative subtyping methodologies have been reviewed by Wattiau et al.

As of 2000, 2,463 serotypes of the species Salmonella enterica were known, including 489 belonging to the subspecies Salmonella enterica subsp. salamae (Salmonella enterica II). This subspecies and all its serotypes have cold-blooded animals as hosts. Its counterpart, Salmonella enterica subsp. enterica (Salmonella enterica I), had 1,454 known serotypes at that time; its hosts are warm-blooded animals. In 2007, the number of known serotypes of Salmonella enterica rose to 2,557, including 505 for Salmonella enterica II and 1,531 for Salmonella enterica I. Some serotypes are found only in a single type of host animal or in a restricted geographic area. Others are found in various animal species worldwide.

=== Streptococcus ===
Streptococcus pneumoniae has 93 capsular serotypes. 91 of these serotypes use the Wzy enzyme pathway. The Wzy pathway is used by almost all gram-positive bacteria, by lactococci and streptococci (exopolysacchide), and is also responsible for group 1 and 4 Gram-negative capsules.

== Viruses ==
=== Dengue ===
Orthoflavivirus denguei, the dengue virus, has four commonly found serotypes, denoted DENV-1 to DENV-4. A person infected with one of these serotypes is immune to it for life, but remains vulnerable to others. A fifth serotype, DENV-5, was discovered in 2013 in the state of Sarawak, Malaysia. · However, the latter was not yet found later, neither in Malaysia nor elsewhere, at least according to a document from the "International Journal of Clinical & Medical Microbiology" dating from early 2016.

=== Human papillomavirus ===
According to a study published in 2024 carried out on a sample of 63 women affected by human papillomavirus, the serotypes HPV 6, HPV 82 and HPV 89 appear to be those at low risk (1.5% for each), while the HPV 81 serotype is the one most often encountered in subjects affected by a single infection (40.9%). Among subjects experiencing multiple infections, HPV 16 serotype tops the list with 28.8%.

=== SARS-CoV-2 ===
Within a few years since its appearance, SARS-CoV-2 has diversified into different serotypes. All variants before Omicron belong to the single serotype I (gamma). Then come those designated as serotypes II (BA.1), III (BA.2), IV (BA.5), V (XBB), and VI (BA.2.86).

== Other organisms ==
Many other organisms can be classified using recognition by antibodies.

- The malaria pathogen Plasmodium falciparum is notorious for its many surface antigen variants. A certain vaccine candidate is designed to cover all of these serotypes.
- Toxoplasma gondii can be classified into serotypes.
- Trypanosoma cruzi, which causes Chagas disease, can be serotyped using whole parasites.

== Facing vaccines ==
In the fight against Streptococcus pneumoniae (pneumococcus) over the last few decades, various studies have highlighted certain phenomena concerning its serotypes in relation to vaccines:

- A decline in those targeted by the vaccines,

- The emergence of those not targeted by vaccines

- A geographical disparity, and

- A resurgence of certain already targeted by vaccines

=== Decline ===
In 2000, the PCV7 vaccine was launched in the United States. This vaccine—the letters PCV standing for « Pneumococcal Conjugate Vaccine »—aims to immunize recipients against 7 pneumococcal serotypes: 4, 6B, 9V, 14, 18C, 19F, and 23F. The national vaccination program that was launched was intended for children under 5 years of age.. This program has been a success. The number of cases of IPD (Invasive Pneumococcal Disease) caused by the 7 serotypes targeted by the vaccine has been significantly reduced - not only among vaccinated children, but also among older, unvaccinated children and adults. Other countries followed the example. Similar vaccination programs were launched: Austria and Luxembourg in 2004; Belgium and Switzerland in 2005; Germany, France, the Netherlands, and the United Kingdom in 2006; Hungary and Ireland in 2008, and so on.. By August 2008, 90 of the 193 member countries of the World Health Organization had already purchased licenses to use PCV7, although most did so for programs that were less ambitious than those in the United States or the aforementioned countries.. The 7 targeted serotypes of Streptococcus pneumoniae have shown a decline in their pathogenic activity. In the United States, during the 1999–2000 period, they were responsible for 85% of pneumococcal bacteremia episodes, whereas for the period from 2001 to May 2005, this figure had fallen to 34%. Regarding the number of hospitalizations for pneumonia among children under 2 years of age in the United States, the rate was 1,274 per 100,000 children during the 1997–1999 period, and 873 per 100,000 during the 2001–2006 period.

=== Emergence of other serotypes ===
A few years after the launch of the PCV7 vaccine, an increase was observed in the prevalence of certain pneumococcal serotypes not included in the vaccine. This has led to a loss of efficacy—affecting both vaccinated and unvaccinated populations—in countries with high vaccine coverage. The most pathogenic new serotypes were then selected for inclusion in a new version of the vaccine. In April 2009, the PCV10 vaccine was launched in Germany. It contains the 7 serotypes from PCV7, plus three others: 1, 5, and 7F.

. Thus, as part of the ongoing struggle between humans and Streptococcus pneumoniae, there are, among other things, vaccines that incorporate more and more serotypes of this bacterium:

- PCV13 was introduced in Germany in December 2009, containing all the serotypes in PCV10, plus 3, 6A, and 19A.
- PCV15 was approved and introduced in the United States in 2021, containing all the serotypes found in PCV13, plus 22F and 33F.
- PCV20 was also approved and introduced in the United States in 2021; it contains all the serotypes found in PCV15, plus 8, 10A, 11A, 12F, and 15B.
- PCV24, in clinical testing phase as of April 2026, containing all the serotypes of PCV20, plus 2, 9N, 17F, and 20.
- PCV31, in the development phase as of March 2026, containing all PCV24 serotypes, plus 7C, 15A, 16F, 23A, 23B, 31, and 35B.

As of March 2025, 108 serotypes of the species Streptococcus pneumoniae are known, 18 of which were discovered from 2007, after the launch of the PCV7 vaccine.

=== Geographical disparity ===
Vaccines have an impact on the populations of Streptococcus pneumoniae serotypes, and studies have identified shifts in the landscape across different geographical areas.

For the 2008–2010 period, the three serotypes 7F, 19A, and 1 accounted for 68% of invasive pneumococcal disease (IPD) cases in children under 5 years of age in the United Kingdom. The situation is similar in France in 2009 and in Belgium in 2010, where the same three serotypes cause IPD in children with similar percentages. In contrast, for Austria in 2009, more than two-thirds of IPD cases in children under 5 years of age were caused by serotypes 3, 14, and 18C. Serotypes 14 and 18C are those included in the PCV7 vaccine. What we can see is that the vaccination program is poorly followed in Austria, and the national coverage of PCV7 was around 30% in 2005-2007 and that of PCV10 (which includes PCV7 serotypes) in 2009 was 9%. These values are far behind the approximately 80% coverage in France and the United Kingdom, or the 100% in Belgium.

Around 2015, serotype 23F is the most predominant among children in Iran, while 14 is its counterpart in Algeria and Morocco. In 2013, serotype 19F ceased to be the most predominant in Kuwait, and was replaced by 12F, the country having adopted PCV13 in 2010.

New Zealand adopted PCV13 in 2014. But in 2017, it returned to PCV10. It can be seen that serotype 19A, included in PCV13 but not in PCV10, constantly increased from 11.5% in 2017 to 29.5% in 2021. Its neighbor Australia, which kept PCV13, saw its percentage of 19A in 2017 at 5.5% drop to 4.5% in 2021.

The cases mentioned so far show that vaccines are effective. If we observe differences in predominance at the level of serotypes, we could find reasons in the difference in coverage rate, the year of launch of a vaccine, or the schedule (2+1 or 3+1). But sometimes there may be statistics that show a lack of effectiveness of a certain vaccine. This is the case of PCV13 in Stockholm County in Sweden. For a vaccination coverage of 97%, after 4 years of vaccine adoption, there is only a slight decline in non-PCV7 serotypes, and an increase in non-PCV13 serotypes.

=== Resurgence ===
Serotype 19F, which was reduced by up to 50% in the United States, especially by PCV7, has been on an upward curve since 2012, reaching in 2019 the same level as the years 1998-1999 before the introduction of PCV7, then in 2023 a level almost 50% higher. It is predominant in certain places on the globe, but nevertheless remains discreet in certain other places. Researchers worked on several hypotheses to explain this phenomenon. A resurgence of serotypes 4, 12F and 14 in Belgium since 2020, and an increase in serotypes 4, 9V, 19F and 12F in Canada after 2018 are also recorded..

== Antibiotic resistance ==
=== Klebsiella pneumoniae ===
A study in China during the 2022–2024 period concerning the bacterium K. pneumoniae has focused on certain serotypes of this species. These serotypes belong to two groups: one referred to as "hvKp" (hypervirulent K), and the other as « MDR-related »—with "MDR" standing for MultiDrug-Resistant. The first group includes serotypes K1, K2, K5, K20, K54, and K57. The second group includes serotypes K47 and K64.. These serotypes put up significant resistance to the 16 antibiotics included in the study—for example, slightly over 30% to cefoxitin, or more than 83% to ampicillin. Regarding two members of the highly promising carbapenem class of antibiotics, resistance rates exceed 20% facing imipenem and 26% against meropenem..

=== Streptococcus pneumoniae ===
In a synthesis of 90 studies conducted in 43 countries across 6 continents regarding the serotypes of Streptococcus pneumoniae, published in December 2025, the following results can be found:

- 24F is the leader in resistance to clindamycin, with a rate of approximately 84%.

- 5 is the leader in resistance to co-trimoxazole, with a rate of 100%.

- 33F is the leader in resistance to erythromycin, with a rate of approximately 93%. At the other end of the spectrum, 7F has a rate of 0.01%.

- 35B is the leader in resistance to penicillin, with a rate of around 60%.

- 23F is the leader in resistance to tetracycline, with a rate of approximately 87%.

- In terms of multidrug resistance, 23F ranks highest, with a rate of over 63%. The lowest rate is seen in 22F, at 0.18%..

In France, for cases of invasive pneumococcal disease (IPD), the rate of non-susceptibility to penicillin in 2001 was slightly over 47%. From the end of 2001 onwards—thanks to a policy of rationalizing antibiotic use and the gradual introduction of the PCV7 vaccine starting in 2003—this rate had a period of regression. It fell at approximately 29% in 2009, and then around 28% in 2011. Unfortunately, from 2013, it was again in a rising trend, and exceeded 51% by 2021.. The study conducted by the 23 Regional Pneumococcal Observatories (ORP - Observatoires Régionaux du Pneumocoque) over the 2009–2021 period, which analyzed more than 19,000 strains, shows less alarming trends for cefotaxime, erythromycin, co-trimoxazole, and norfloxacin, but a clear increase for amoxicillin. The pneumococcal serotypes that are most resistant to antibiotics are those not included in the vaccines currently in use in France - namely, PCV7 and, subsequently, PCV13..

== See also ==
- Biovar
- Morphovar
