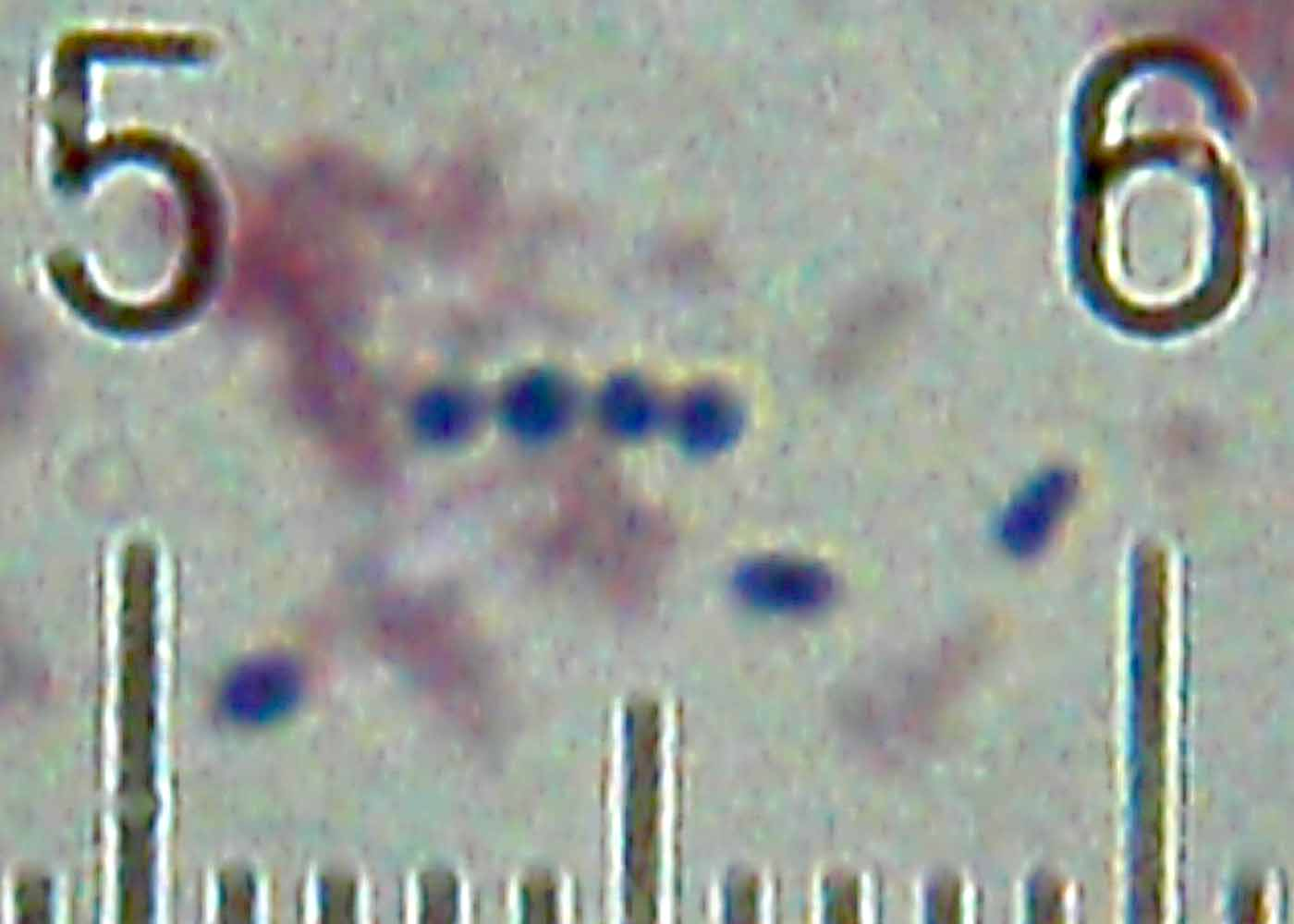

Scientific classification
- Domain: Bacteria
- Kingdom: Bacillati
- Phylum: Bacillota
- Class: Bacilli
- Order: Lactobacillales
- Family: Streptococcaceae
- Genus: Streptococcus
- Species: S. thermophilus

Binomial name
- Streptococcus thermophilus Orla-Jensen 1919 (Approved Lists 1980) (Note: The name appears both on Approved Lists 1980 and on Validation List No. 54 of 1995. When cited as the latter, the author string would be "(ex Orla-Jensen 1919) Schleifer et al. 1995". However, the validation of a name already on the Approved Lists is an obvious error and the older citation should take precedence. Nevertheless, Schleifer's 1991 "revival" article dos provide additional evidence for the species's distinctiveness.)

Synonyms
- Streptococcus salivarius subsp. thermophilus (Orla-Jensen, 1919) Farrow et Collins 1984

= Streptococcus thermophilus =

Species of bacterium

Streptococcus thermophilus, formerly known as Streptococcus salivarius subsp. thermophilus, is a gram-positive bacterium and fermentative facultative anaerobe that is used for producing yogurt and other fermented milk products. It tests negative for cytochrome, oxidase, and catalase, and positive for alpha-hemolytic activity. It is non-motile and does not form endospores. S. thermophilus is fimbriated.

It is also classified as a lactic acid bacterium. S. thermophilus is found in fermented milk products and is generally used in the production of yogurt, alongside Lactobacillus delbrueckii subsp. bulgaricus. The two species are synergistic, and S. thermophilus probably provides L. d. bulgaricus with folic acid and formic acid, which it uses for purine synthesis. S. thermophilus has an optimal growth temperature range of 35–42 °C (95–108 °F), while L. d. bulgaricus has an optimal range of 43–46 °C (109–115 °F).

== Classification ==
At least 26 strains of S. thermophilus have been identified and had their genomes sequenced.

Test type	Test	Characteristics
Colony characters	Color	Yellowish
Colony characters	Shape	Convex
Colony characters	Type	Round
Morphological characters	Shape	Round
Morphological characters	Size	0.7-0.9 μm
Physiological characters	Motility	-
Biological characters	Gram stain	+
Biological characters	Catalase	-
Biological characters	Oxidase	-
Biological characters	Cytochrome	-

== Uses ==
S. thermophilus is one of the most widely used bacteria in the dairy industry. USDA statistics from 1998 showed that more than 1.02 billion kilograms of mozzarella cheese and 621 million kilograms of yogurt were produced from S. thermophilus. Although its genus, Streptococcus, includes some pathogenic species, food industries consider S. thermophilus a safer bacterium than many other Streptococcus species. In fact, yogurt and cheese that contain live cultures of S. thermophilus are thought to be beneficial to health. Live cultures of S. thermophilus make it easier for people who are lactose-intolerant to digest dairy products. The bacteria breaks down lactose, the sugar in milk, that lactose-intolerant people find difficult to digest.

=== Yogurt production ===
As early as the 1900s, S. thermophilus was used to make yogurt. Its purpose is to turn lactose, the sugar in milk, into lactic acid. The increase in lactic acid turns milk into the gel-like structure characteristic of yogurt.

== Nomenclature ==
"Streptococcus" derives from a Greek term meaning "twisted kernel" and refers to the way the bacterium is grouped in chains that resemble a string of beads. "Thermophilus" derives from the Greek thermē, meaning "heat", and philus, meaning to appreciate or to like. It refers to an organism's ability to thrive at high temperatures.

== Research ==
=== Pathogenic potential ===
The genus Streptococcus includes several pathogenic species, such as S. pneumoniae and S. pyogenes, but food industries consider S. thermophilus non-pathogenic. S. thermophilus is believed to have developed separately from pathogenic Streptococcus species for at least 3000 years. Research teams have sequenced the genome of two strains of S. thermophilus, CNRZ1066 and LMG13811, and stated that the bacteria are not dangerous.

=== Adjuvant ===
S. thermophilus strain Orla-Jensen 1919 is a constituent in VSL#3. This standardized formulation of live bacteria may be used in combination with conventional therapies to treat ulcerative colitis. The use of the S. thermophilus-containing VSL#3 may reduce inflammation in mice.

=== Reduced-fat cheese ===
S. thermophilus helps make reduced-fat cheese with similar characteristics to regular, full-fat cheese. In the experiment, two different strains of bacteria are used to make reduced-fat cheddar cheese: a strain of Lactococcus lactis and a strain of S. thermophilus. These bacteria are chosen because they produce exopolysaccharide (EPS), which give reduced-fat cheese a texture and flavor like that of regular cheese.

L. lactis produces cheese with higher moisture levels compared to other reduced-fat cheeses; S. thermophilus produces cheese with a lower moisture content and a less bitter taste. It was concluded that applying both L. lactis and S. thermophilus strains would create higher-quality reduced-fat cheese with characteristics like those of regular cheese.

=== Cancer ===
Chemotherapy often causes mucositis, severe inflammation of primarily the small intestines. Currently, there is no treatment to alleviate the symptoms of mucositis caused by chemotherapy. When rats were inflicted with mucositis by chemotherapy drugs, the intestinal tissues in those pretreated with Streptococcus thermophilus TH-4 functioned more healthily and were less distressed.

=== Antibiotic-associated diarrhea ===
Strains of S. thermophilus have also reduced risks of antibiotic-associated diarrhea (AAD), an issue that results from taking antibiotics. Antibiotics can have the adverse effect of destroying beneficial bacteria and causing harmful bacteria to multiply, which invokes AAD. Adults who ate yogurt containing S. thermophilus while being treated with antibiotics had lower rates of AAD than the control group (12.4% vs. 23.7%).

=== Longevity in other organisms ===
Streptococcus thermophilus has been linked to longevity in some living organisms. In an experiment performed on the bacteriophagous nematode species Caenorhabditis elegans, consumption of S. thermophilus was shown to cause significant longevity when compared to specimens that consumed E. coli OP50, a strain used as a standard food source. Additionally, there was no significant deviation in growth rate or brood size, indicating that it wasn't caused by caloric restriction. Instead, its life-extending effects were linked to increased expression of the gene daf-16. This effect further enhances the expression of other antioxidant genes, thereby slowing down the aging process.

== Health concerns ==
Although probiotics, in general, are considered safe, there are concerns about their use in certain cases. Some people, such as those with compromised immune systems, short bowel syndrome, central venous catheters, heart valve disease and premature infants, may be at higher risk for adverse events. Rarely, the use of probiotics has caused sepsis in children with lowered immune systems or in those who are already critically ill.
