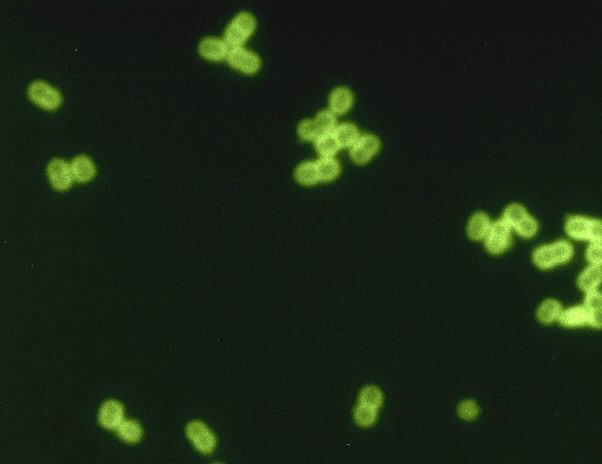
- S. pneumoniae in spinal fluid. FA stain (digitally colored).

Scientific classification
- Domain: Bacteria
- Kingdom: Bacillati
- Phylum: Bacillota
- Class: Bacilli
- Order: Lactobacillales
- Family: Streptococcaceae
- Genus: Streptococcus
- Species: S. pneumoniae

Binomial name
- Streptococcus pneumoniae (Klein 1884) Chester 1901

= Streptococcus pneumoniae =

Species of bacterium

Streptococcus pneumoniae, or pneumococcus, is a Gram-positive, spherical bacteria, alpha-hemolytic member of the genus Streptococcus. S. pneumoniae cells are usually found in pairs (diplococci) and do not form spores and are non motile. As a significant human pathogenic bacterium S. pneumoniae was recognized as a major cause of pneumonia in the late 19th century, and is the subject of many humoral immunity studies.

Streptococcus pneumoniae resides asymptomatically in healthy carriers, typically colonizing the respiratory tract, sinuses, and nasal cavity. However, in susceptible individuals with weaker immune systems, such as the elderly and young children, the bacterium may become pathogenic and spread to other locations to cause disease. It spreads by direct person-to-person contact via respiratory droplets and by auto-inoculation in persons carrying the bacteria in their upper respiratory tracts. It can be a cause of neonatal infections.

Streptococcus pneumoniae is the main cause of community acquired pneumonia and meningitis in children and the elderly, and of sepsis in those infected with HIV. The organism also causes many types of pneumococcal infections other than pneumonia. These invasive pneumococcal diseases include bronchitis, rhinitis, acute sinusitis, otitis media, conjunctivitis, meningitis, sepsis, osteomyelitis, septic arthritis, endocarditis, peritonitis, pericarditis, cellulitis, and brain abscess.

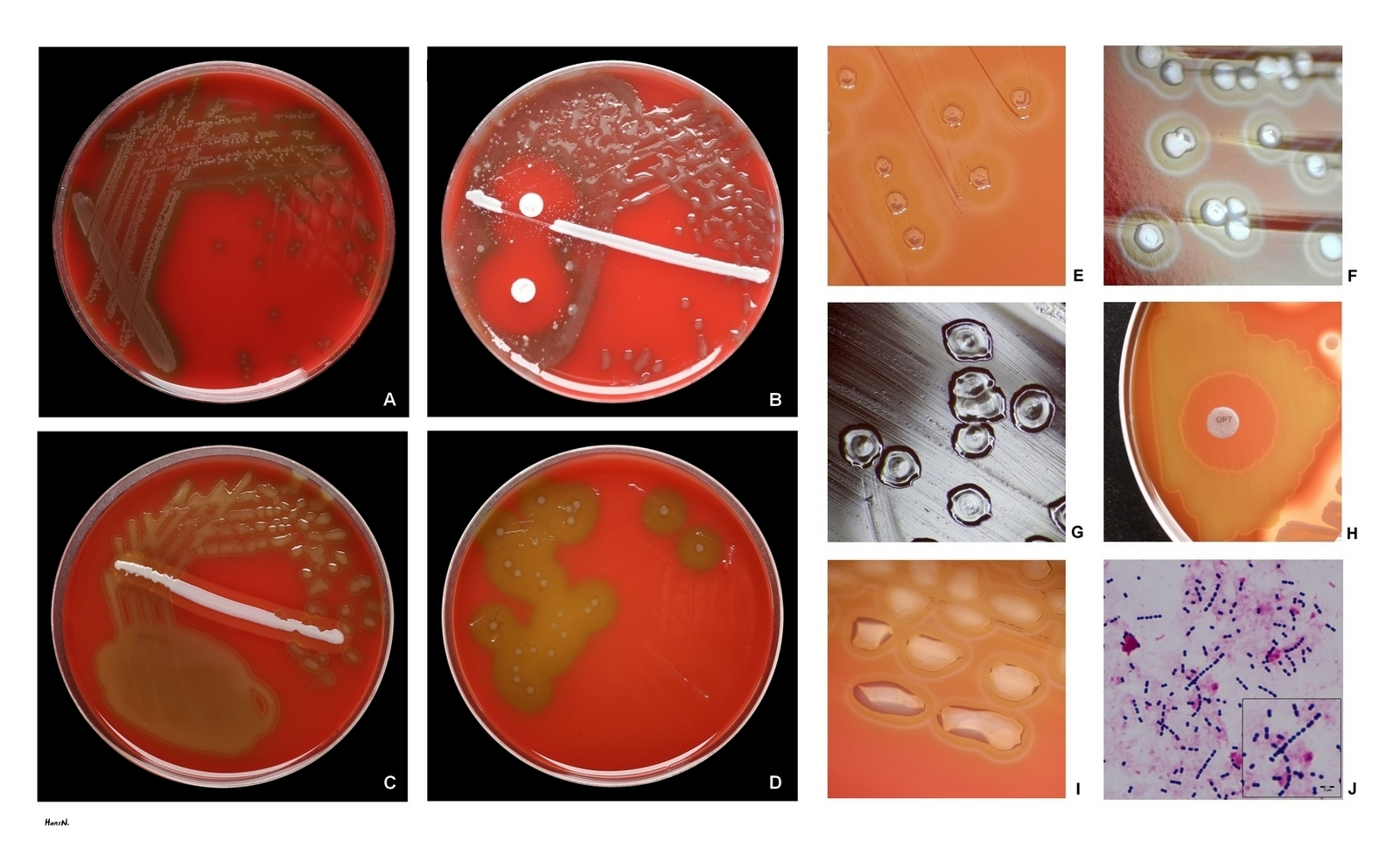
Streptococcus pneumoniae growth on blood agar.

Streptococcus pneumoniae can be differentiated from the viridans streptococci, some of which are also alpha-hemolytic, using an optochin test, as S. pneumoniae is optochin-sensitive. S. pneumoniae can also be distinguished based on its sensitivity to lysis by bile, the so-called "bile solubility test". The encapsulated, Gram-positive, coccoid bacteria have a distinctive morphology on Gram stain, lancet-shaped diplococci. They have a polysaccharide capsule that acts as a virulence factor for the organism; more than 100 different serotypes are known , and these types differ in virulence, prevalence, and extent of drug resistance.

The capsular polysaccharide (CPS) serves as a critical defense mechanism against the host immune system. It composes the outermost layer of encapsulated strains of S. pneumoniae and is commonly attached to the peptidoglycan of the cell wall. It consists of a viscous substance derived from a high-molecular-weight polymer composed of repeating oligosaccharide units linked by covalent bonds to the cell wall. The virulence and invasiveness of various strains of S. pneumoniae vary according to their serotypes, determined by their chemical composition and the quantity of CPS they produce. Variations among different S. pneumoniae strains significantly influence pathogenesis, determining bacterial survival and likelihood of causing invasive disease. Additionally, the CPS inhibits phagocytosis by preventing granulocytes' access to the cell wall.

== History ==
In 1881, the organism, known later in 1886 as the pneumococcus for its role as a cause of pneumonia, was first isolated simultaneously and independently by the U.S. Army physician George Sternberg and the French chemist Louis Pasteur.

The organism was termed Diplococcus pneumoniae from 1920 because of its characteristic appearance in Gram-stained sputum. It was renamed Streptococcus pneumoniae in 1974 because it was very similar to streptococci.

Streptococcus pneumoniae played a central role in demonstrating that genetic material consists of DNA. In 1928, Frederick Griffith demonstrated transformation of life, turning harmless pneumococcus into a lethal form by co-inoculating the live pneumococci into a mouse along with heat-killed virulent pneumococci. In 1944, Oswald Avery, Colin MacLeod, and Maclyn McCarty demonstrated that the transforming factor in Griffith's experiment was not protein, as was widely believed at the time, but DNA. Avery's work marked the birth of the molecular era of genetics.

== Genetics ==
The genome of S. pneumoniae is a closed, circular DNA structure that contains between 2.0 and 2.1 million base pairs depending on the strain. It has a core set of 1553 genes, plus 154 genes in its virulome, which contribute to virulence, and 176 genes that maintain a noninvasive phenotype. Genetic information can vary up to 10% between strains. The pneumococcal genome is known to contain a large and diverse repertoire of antimicrobial peptides, including 11 different lantibiotics.

=== Transformation ===
Natural bacterial transformation involves the transfer of DNA from one bacterium to another through the surrounding medium. Transformation is a complex developmental process requiring energy and depends on the expression of numerous genes. In S. pneumoniae, at least 23 genes are required for transformation. For a bacterium to bind, take up, and recombine exogenous DNA into its chromosome, it must enter a special physiological state called competence. Competence in S. pneumoniae is induced by DNA-damaging agents such as mitomycin C, fluoroquinolone antibiotics (norfloxacin, levofloxacin and moxifloxacin), and topoisomerase inhibitors. Transformation protects S. pneumoniae against the bactericidal effect of mitomycin C. Michod et al. summarized evidence that induction of competence in S. pneumoniae is associated with increased resistance to oxidative stress and increased expression of the RecA protein, a key component of the recombinational repair machinery for removing DNA damage. Based on these findings, they suggested that transformation is an adaptation for repairing oxidative DNA damage. S. pneumoniae infection stimulates polymorphonuclear leukocytes (granulocytes) to produce an oxidative burst that is potentially lethal to the bacteria. The ability of S. pneumoniae to repair oxidative DNA damage in its genome caused by this host defense likely contributes to the pathogen's virulence. Consistent with this premise, Li et al. reported that, among different highly transformable S. pneumoniae isolates, nasal colonization fitness and virulence (lung infectivity) depend on an intact competence system.

== Infection ==
Streptococcus pneumoniae is part of the normal upper respiratory tract flora. As with many natural flora, it can become pathogenic under the right conditions, typically when the host's immune system is suppressed. Invasins, such as pneumolysin, an antiphagocytic capsule, various adhesins, and immunogenic cell wall components are all major virulence factors. After S. pneumoniae colonizes the air sacs of the lungs, the body responds by stimulating the inflammatory response, causing plasma, blood, and white blood cells to fill the alveoli. This condition is called bacterial pneumonia.

S. pneumoniae undergoes spontaneous phase variation, changing between transparent and opaque colony phenotypes. The transparent phenotype has a thinner capsule and expresses large amounts of phosphorylcholine (ChoP) and choline-binding protein A (CbpA), contributing to the bacteria's ability to adhere and colonize in the nasopharynx. The opaque phenotype is characterized by a thicker capsule, resulting in increased resistance to host clearance. It expresses large amounts of capsule and pneumococcal surface protein A (PspA), which help the bacteria survive in the blood. Phase-variation between these two phenotypes allows S. pneumoniae to survive in different human body systems.

== Diseases and symptoms ==
Pneumonia is the most prevalent disease caused by Streptococcus pneumoniae. Pneumonia is a lung infection characterized by symptoms such as fever, chills, coughing, rapid or labored breathing, and chest pain. For the elderly, those who contract pneumonia have also shown these lesser nonspecific symptoms, but also tend to show that they have tachypnea a few days before clinical certainty that they have contracted the bacterial illness. Tachypnea is characterized by rapid, shallow breathing and can affect a person's ability to sleep, cause chest pain, and decrease appetite.

While different bacterial infections can cause meningitis, S. pneumoniae is a leading cause. Pneumococcal meningitis occurs when the bacteria spread from the bloodstream to the central nervous system, which is made up of the brain and the spinal cord. Here, the infection will spread and cause inflammation, leading to severe disabilities like brain damage or hearing loss, limb removal, or death. Symptoms include common problems such as head aches, fevers, and nausea, but the more telling signs that a bacterial infection may have reached the brain are sensitivity to light, seizures, having limited range in neck movement, and easy bruising all over the body.

Osteomyelitis, or bone infection, is a rare occurrence but has been seen in patients who were diagnosed to have a S. pneumoniae infection that went untreated for too long.

An overwhelming response to an infection that causes tissue damage causes sepsis, which can lead to organ failure, and even death. The symptoms include confusion, shortness of breath, elevated heart rate, pain or discomfort, overperspiration, fever, shivering, or feeling cold.

Less severe illnesses that can be caused by pneumococcal infection include conjunctivitis (pink eye ), otitis media (middle ear infection), Bronchitis (airway inflammation), and sinusitis (sinus infection).

== Vaccine ==
Share of one year olds vaccinated against streptococcus pneumoniae Map

Due to the importance of disease caused by S. pneumoniae, several vaccines have been developed to protect against invasive infection. The World Health Organization recommends routine childhood pneumococcal vaccination; it is incorporated into the childhood immunization schedule in a number of countries including the United Kingdom, the United States, Greece, and South Africa.

Currently, two vaccines are available for S. pneumoniae: the pneumococcal polysaccharide vaccine (PPV23 or PPSV23) and the pneumococcal conjugate vaccine (PCV13). PPV23 functions by utilizing CPS to stimulate the production of type-specific antibodies, initiating processes such as complement activation, opsonization, and phagocytosis to combat bacterial infections. It elicits a humoral immune response targeting the CPS present on the bacterial surface. PPSV23 offers T-cell-independent immunity and requires revaccination 5 years after the first vaccination because of its temporary nature. PCV13 was developed after determining PPSV23's low efficacy in children and infants. PCV13 elicits a T-cell-dependent response and provides enduring immunity by promoting interaction between B and T cells, leading to an enhanced, prolonged immune response; it is most effective in young children.

== Biotechnology ==
Components from S. pneumoniae have been harnessed for a range of biotechnology applications. Through engineering of surface molecules from this bacterium, proteins can be irreversibly linked using the sortase enzyme or using the SnoopTag/SnoopCatcher reaction. Various glycoside hydrolases have also been cloned from S. pneumoniae to help analysis of cell glycosylation.

== Interaction with Haemophilus influenzae ==
Historically, Haemophilus influenzae has been a significant cause of infection, and both H. influenzae and S. pneumoniae can be found in the human upper respiratory system. A study of competition in vitro revealed S. pneumoniae overpowered H. influenzae by attacking it with hydrogen peroxide. There is also evidence that S. pneumoniae uses hydrogen peroxide as a virulence factor. However, in a study adding both bacteria to the nasal cavity of a mouse within two weeks, only H. influenzae survives; further analysis showed that neutrophils (a type of phagocyte) exposed to dead H. influenzae were more aggressive in attacking S. pneumoniae.

== Diagnosis ==
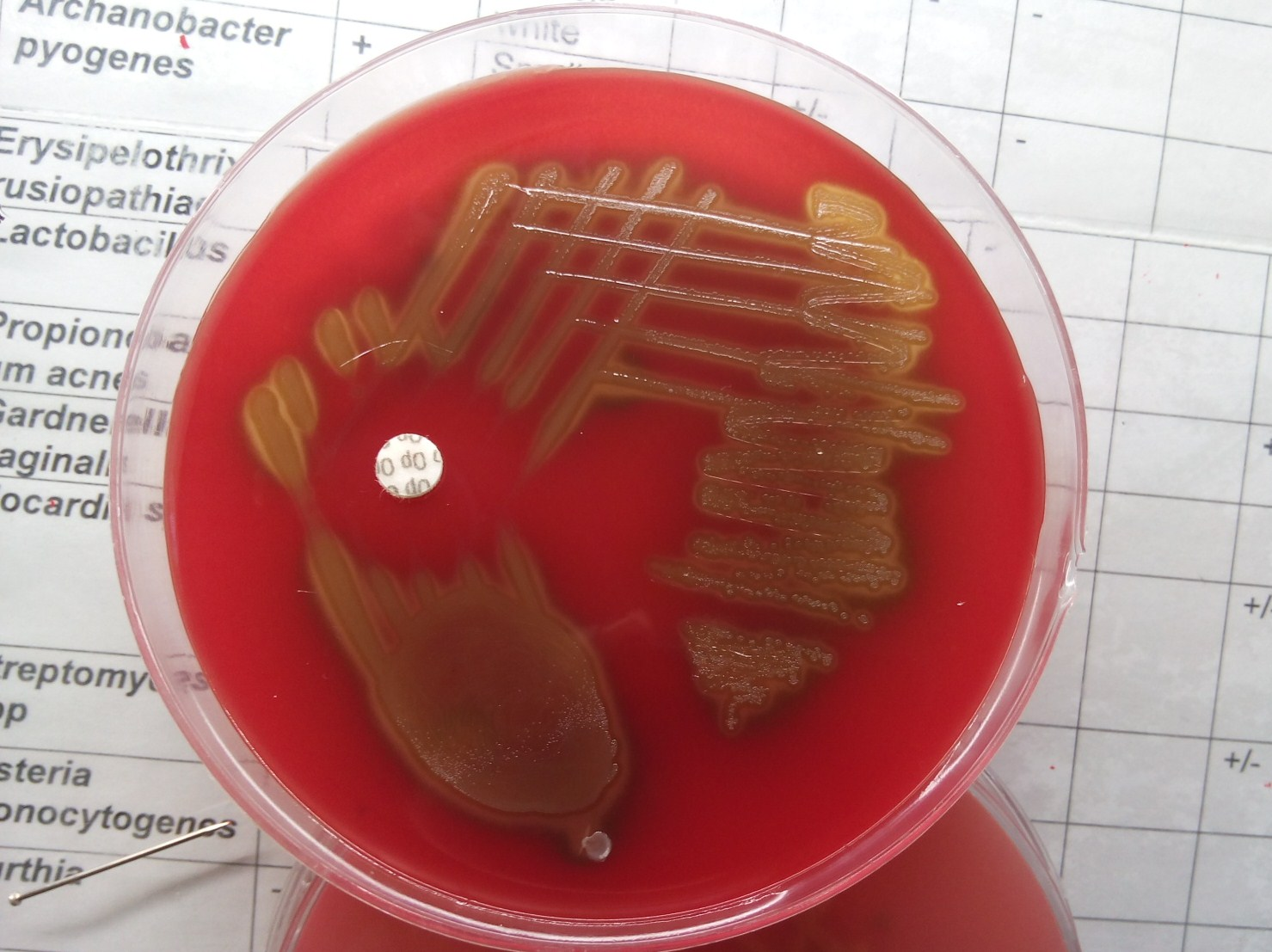
Optochin sensitivity in a culture of Streptococcus pneumoniae (white disk)

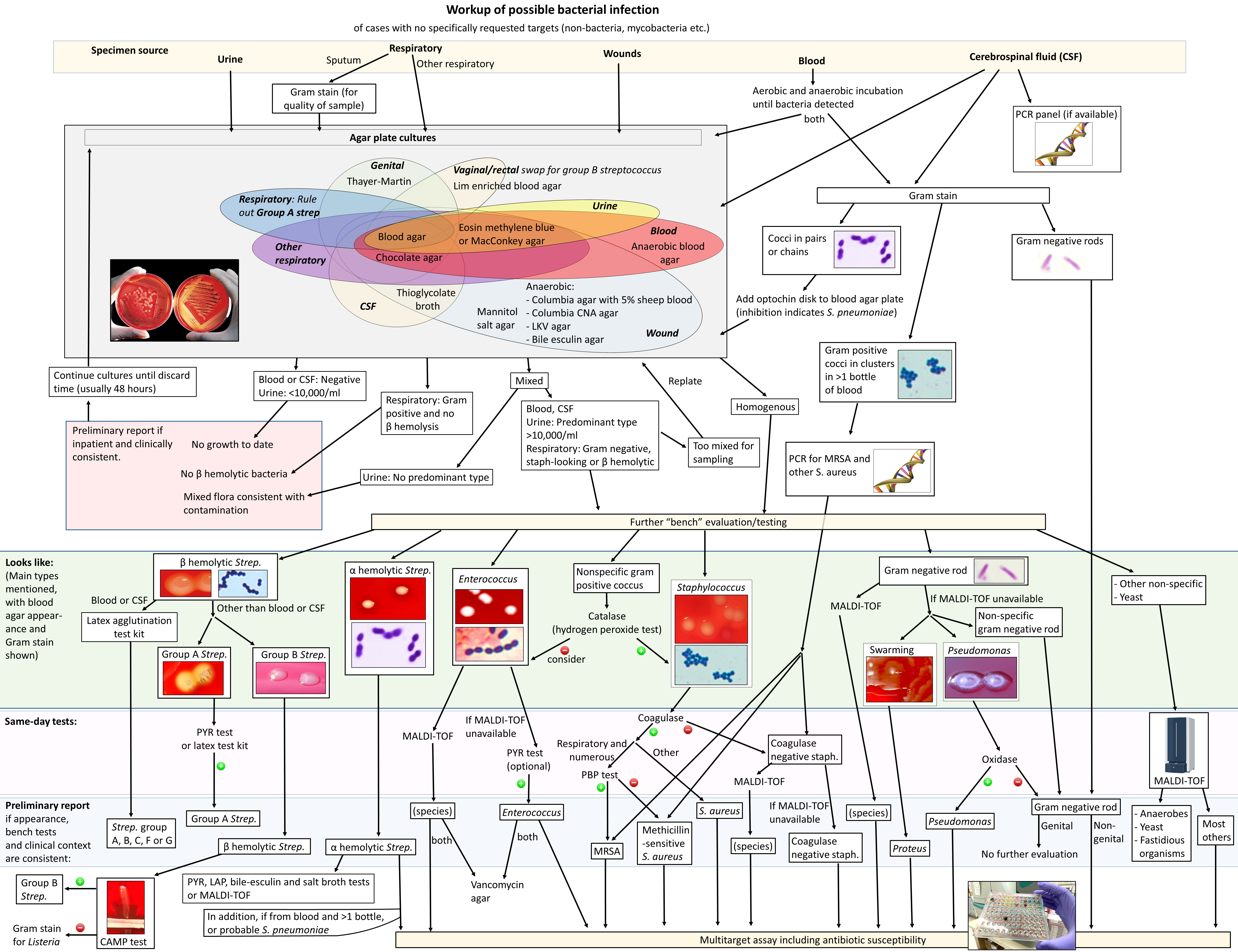
Example of a workup algorithm of possible bacterial infection in cases with no specifically requested targets (non-bacteria, mycobacteria, etc.), with most common situations and agents seen in a New England community hospital setting. Streptococcus pneumoniae is mentioned at gram stain near top right, and again in the alpha-hemolytic workflow in lower left quadrant.

Diagnosis is generally made based on clinical suspicion along with a positive culture from a sample from virtually any place in the body. S. pneumoniae is, in general, optochin sensitive, although optochin resistance has been observed.

The recent advances in next-generation sequencing and comparative genomics have enabled the development of robust and reliable molecular methods for the detection and identification of S. pneumoniae. For instance, the Xisco gene was recently described as a biomarker for PCR-based detection of S. pneumoniae and differentiation from closely related species.

Atromentin and leucomelone possess antibacterial activity, inhibiting the enzyme enoyl-acyl carrier protein reductase, (essential for the biosynthesis of fatty acids) in S. pneumoniae.

== Resistance ==
Resistant pneumococcal strains are called penicillin-resistant pneumococci (PRP), penicillin-resistant Streptococcus pneumoniae (PRSP), Streptococcus pneumoniae penicillin resistant (SPPR) or drug-resistant Strepotococcus pneumoniae (DRSP). In 2015, in the US, there were an estimated 30,000 cases, and in 30% of them, the strains were resistant to one or more antibiotics.

Beyond penicillin, S. pneumoniae also demonstrates high resistance to other antibiotic classes, including macrolides (such as erythromycin), lincosamides (such as clindamycin), and tetracyclines, as reported in a study of Chinese isolates. However, novel antibiotics such as eravacycline, omadacycline, contezolid, and nemonoxacin have exhibited considerable in vitro antimicrobial activity against S. pneumoniae.

S. pneumoniae's higher sensitivity to eravacycline and omadacycline compared to previous generations of tetracyclines is due to structural modifications in these antibiotics that enhance target binding and reduce recognition. Tetracycline resistance in S. pneumoniae is associated with mutations in tet genes as well as rpsJ and rpsC genes.

Fluoroquinolones such as nemonoxacin are an effective treatment for community-acquired pneumonia (CAP) and resistance in S. pneumoniae is relatively low; resistance may be acquired through point mutations in resistance genes gyrA, gyrB, parC, parE, patA, and patB.

Oxazolidinones, such as Contezolid, show in vitro efficacy against many Gram-positive cocci. Oxazolidinone resistance in S. pneumoniae is associated with mutations in the peptidyl transferase central loop of the ribosomal 23S rRNA domain V.

== See also ==
- Transformation (genetics)
- Pneumococcal Awareness Council of Experts
- Facultative anaerobic organism
