= Trimethoprim/sulfamethoxazole =

Combination of two antibiotic drugs

- Trimethoprim (top) and sulfamethoxazole (bottom)

Combination of
- Sulfamethoxazole: Sulfonamide antibiotic
- Trimethoprim: Dihydrofolate reductase inhibitor

Clinical data
- Trade names: Bactrim, Cotrim, Septra, others
- Other names: TMP/SMX, Co-trimoxazole (BAN UK)
- AHFS/Drugs.com: Monograph
- License data: US DailyMed: Sulfamethoxazole trimethoprim
- Pregnancy category: AU: C
- Routes of administration: Oral, Intravenous infusion
- ATC code: J01EE01 (WHO) J04AM08 (WHO)

Legal status
- Legal status: AU: S4 (Prescription only); CA: ℞-only; UK: POM (Prescription only); US: ℞-only

Identifiers
- CAS Number: 8064-90-2
- PubChem CID: 358641
- ChemSpider: 318412
- KEGG: D00285
- ChEBI: CHEBI:3770
- ChEMBL: ChEMBL58061
- CompTox Dashboard (EPA): DTXSID0032233

Trimethoprim/sulfamethoxazole (TMP/SMX), sold under the trade names Bactrim, Cotrim (a short form of the British Approved Name, Co-trimoxazole) and Septra, among others, is a fixed-dose combination antibiotic medication used to treat a variety of bacterial infections. It consists of one part trimethoprim to five parts sulfamethoxazole. It is used to treat urinary tract infections, methicillin-resistant Staphylococcus aureus (MRSA) skin infections, travelers' diarrhea, respiratory tract infections, and cholera, among others. It is used both to treat and prevent Pneumocystis pneumonia and toxoplasmosis in people with HIV/AIDS and other causes of immunosuppression. It can be given orally (swallowed by mouth) or intravenous infusion (slowly injected into a vein with an IV).

Trimethoprim/sulfamethoxazole is on the World Health Organization's List of Essential Medicines. It is available as a generic medication. In 2023, it was the 128th most commonly prescribed medication in the United States, with more than 4 million prescriptions.

== Medical uses ==
Trimethoprim/sulfamethoxazole generally kills bacteria, by blocking the microorganisms' ability to make and to use folate.

=== Pneumocystis jirovecii pneumonia ===
Trimethoprim/sulfamethoxazole is the medicine most commonly used to prevent Pneumocystis jirovecii pneumonia (PCP) People who get Pneumocystis pneumonia have a medical condition that weakens their immune system, like HIV/AIDS, or take medicines (such as corticosteroid, monoclonal antibody and immunosuppressants) that reduce the body's ability to fight bacterial and viral infections. People with HIV/AIDS are less likely to get Pneumocystis pneumonia as a result of antiretroviral therapy (ART). However, Pneumocystis pneumonia is still a substantial public health problem. Most of what is scientifically known about Pneumocystis pneumonia and its treatment comes from studying people with HIV/AIDS.

=== Susceptibility ===
Organisms against which trimethoprim/sulfamethoxazole can be effective include:

- Acinetobacter spp.
- Aeromonas spp.
- Alcaligenes/Achromobacter spp.
- Bartonella henselae
- Bordetella pertussis (pertussis)
- Brucella spp.
- Burkholderia cepacia
- Burkholderia mallei (glanders)
- Burkholderia pseudomallei (melioidosis)
- Chlamydia spp.
- Chryseobacterium meningosepticum
- Citrobacter spp.
- Enterobacter spp.
- Enterococcus spp.
- Escherichia coli
- Haemophilus spp.
- Hafnia alvei
- Kingella spp.
- Klebsiella granulomatis
- Klebsiella pneumoniae
- Legionella spp.
- Listeria monocytogenes (listeriosis)
- Moraxella catarrhalis
- Morganella morganii
- Mycobacterium tuberculosis (tuberculosis)
- Neisseria gonorrhoeae (gonorrhoea)
- Neisseria meningitidis (meningococcal disease)
- Nocardia spp.
- Plesiomonas shigelloides
- Pneumocystis jirovecii
- Proteus mirabilis
- Proteus vulgaris
- Providencia rettgeri
- Providencia stuartii
- Salmonella typhi (typhoid fever)
- Non-typhi (food poisoning) Salmonella
- Serratia spp.
- Shigella spp.
- Staphylococcus aureus
- Staphylococcus epidermidis
- Staphylococcus saprophyticus
- Stenotrophomonas maltophilia
- Streptococcus agalactiae
- Streptococcus pneumoniae
- Streptococcus pyogenes
- Streptococcus viridans
- Toxoplasma gondii (toxoplasmosis)
- Tropheryma whippelii (Whipple's disease)
- Vibrio cholerae (cholera)
- Yersinia enterocolitica
- Yersinia pestis (bubonic plague)
- Yersinia pseudotuberculosis

The only notable nonsusceptible organisms are Pseudomonas aeruginosa, the mycoplasmae and Francisella tularensis (the causative organism of tularaemia).

=== Pregnancy and breast feeding ===
Its use during pregnancy is contraindicated, although it has been placed in Australian pregnancy category C. Its use during the first trimester (during organogenesis) and 12 weeks prior to pregnancy has been associated with an increased risk of congenital malformations, especially malformations associated with maternal folic acid deficiency (which is most likely related to the mechanism of action of co-trimoxazole) such as neural tube defects such as spina bifida, cardiovascular malformations (e.g. Ebstein's anomaly), urinary tract defects, oral clefts, and club foot in epidemiological studies. Its use later on during pregnancy also increases the risk of preterm labour (odds ratio: 1.51) and low birth weight (odds ratio: 1.67). Animal studies have yielded similarly discouraging results.

It appears to be safe for use during breastfeeding as long as the baby is healthy.

=== Infants ===
Its use in those less than 2 months of age is not recommended due to the risk of adverse side effects.

== Contraindications ==
Contraindications include the following:

- Known hypersensitivity to trimethoprim, sulphonamides or any other ingredients in the formulations
- Pregnancy
- Severe liver failure, marked liver parenchymal damage, or jaundice.
- Serious haematological disorders and porphyria (due to the sulfonamide component of the preparation).
- Severe chronic kidney disease (CrCl <15 ml/min) where repeated measurements of the plasma concentration cannot be performed

== Adverse effects ==
Common side effects include nausea, vomiting, rash, and diarrhea. Severe allergic reactions and Clostridioides difficile infection may occasionally occur. Its use in pregnancy is not recommended. It appears to be safe for use during breastfeeding as long as the baby is healthy.

A 2025 study supported previous case reports that the treatment of teens or young adults with trimethoprim/sulfamethoxazole can cause serious adverse results. The study found that the 30-day risk of developing potentially lethal respiratory failure in patients aged 10 to 25 years who were treated with trimethoprim/sulfamethoxazole was significantly higher than those in this age group who were treated with either amoxicillin or a cephalosporin. These findings supported the FDA warning on using trimethoprim/sulfamethoxazole. Overall, the study suggested that this risk of respiratory failure should be carefully weighed against the benefits of using this trimethoprim/sulfamethoxazole drug combination in individuals 10 to 25 years old.

== Overdose ==
Likely signs of toxicity include:

- Nausea
- Vomiting
- Dizziness
- Headache
- Mental depression
- Confusion
- Thrombocytopenia
- Uremia
- Bone marrow depression
- Loss of appetite
- Colic
- Drowsiness
- Unconsciousness

The recommended treatment for overdose includes:

- Administration of activated charcoal
- Stomach pumping
- General supportive measures
- Haemodialysis, which is moderately effective in clearing co-trimoxazole from the plasma.
- Calcium folinate treatment in cases of blood dyscrasias
- Forcing oral fluids

Alkalinisation of the urine may reduce the toxicity of sulfamethoxazole, but it may increase the toxic effects of trimethoprim.

== Interactions ==
Its use is advised against in people being concomitantly treated with:

- ACE inhibitors like captopril, enalapril, lisinopril, perindopril, and ramipril due to the potential for additive hyperkalaemic effects
- Prilocaine — additive risk of methaemoglobinaemia
- Antiarrhythmics like amiodarone (increased risk of ventricular arrhythmias) and dofetilide (increased risk of QT interval prolongation)
- Antibacterials like dapsone (increases plasma levels of both drugs), methenamine (increased risk of crystalluria) and rifampicin (as it may lead to an increased plasma level of rifampicin and lower plasma levels of trimethoprim)
- Anticoagulants like warfarin and acenocoumarol — anticoagulant effects of either drug is potentiated by this combination
- Sulfonylureas — effects enhanced
- Phenytoin, half-life of phenytoin is increased
- Antifolates like pyrimethamine, proguanil and methotrexate increase the risk of associated side effects like bone marrow toxicity, folic acid supplementation should be considered. A significant risk of megaloblastic anaemia exists with doses of pyrimethamine in excess of 25 mg/wk.
- Antivirals, more specifically, lamivudine (increased plasma concentrations of lamivudine), zalcitabine (increased plasma concentrations of zalcitabine) and zidovudine (increased risk of haematological reactions)
- Procainamide and/or amantadine may have their plasma concentrations increased bilaterally or unilaterally.
- Clozapine and other antipsychotics — increased risk of haematological side effects
- Nucleoside analogue antineoplastics like azathioprine and mercaptopurine — increased risk of haematological toxicity
- Digoxin — increase in digoxin levels in a proportion of elderly patients
- Diuretics — elderly patients receiving thiazide diuretics are at a heightened risk for developing thrombocytopenia while on co-trimoxazole
- Ciclosporin — patients who have received a kidney transplant and are receiving co-trimoxazole and ciclosporin concomitantly are at an increased risk of having a reversible deterioration in their kidney function.
- Spironolactone — concurrent use can increase the likelihood of hyperkalemia, especially in the elderly. The trimethoprim portion acts to prevent potassium excretion in the distal tubule of the nephron.
- Potassium aminobenzoate — effects of sulfonamides (like Sulfamethoxazole) inhibited.
- Laboratory tests — trimethoprim and sulfonamides have been reported to interfere with diagnostic tests, including serum-methotrexate and elevated serum creatinine levels, also urea, urinary glucose and urobilinogen tests.

== Pharmacology ==
=== Pharmacodynamics ===
Tetrahydrofolate synthesis pathway

The synergy between trimethoprim and sulfamethoxazole was first described in the late 1960s. Trimethoprim and sulfamethoxazole have a greater effect when given together than when given separately, because they inhibit successive steps in the folate synthesis pathway. They are given in a one-to-five ratio in their tablet formulations so that when they enter the body their concentration in the blood and tissues is roughly one-to-twenty — the exact ratio required for a peak synergistic effect between the two.

Sulfamethoxazole, a sulfonamide, induces its therapeutic effects by interfering with the de novo (that is, from within the cell) synthesis of folate inside microbial organisms such as protozoa, fungi and bacteria. It does this by competing with p-aminobenzoic acid (PABA) in the biosynthesis of dihydrofolate.

Trimethoprim serves as a competitive inhibitor of dihydrofolate reductase (DHFR), hence inhibiting the de novo synthesis of tetrahydrofolate, the biologically active form of folate.

Tetrahydrofolate is crucial in the synthesis of purines, thymidine, and methionine which are needed for the production of DNA and proteins during bacterial replication.

The effects of trimethoprim causes a backlog of dihydrofolate (DHF) and this backlog can work against the inhibitory effect the drug has on tetrahydrofolate biosynthesis. This is where the sulfamethoxazole comes in; its role is in depleting the excess DHF by preventing it from being synthesised in the first place.

Co-trimoxazole was claimed to be more effective than either of its components individually in treating bacterial infections, although this was later disputed.

=== Pharmacokinetics ===
Pharmacokinetics of co-trimoxazole
Component	T_{max} (h)	V_{d} (L)	Protein binding	t_{1/2} (h)	Excretion
Sulfamethoxazole	1-4	20	66%	8-10	Renal
Trimethoprim	1-4	130	42-45%	10	Renal

== History ==
Trimethoprim/sulfamethoxazole was first introduced in the United Kingdom and the European Union in 1969 and in the United States in 1973.

== Society and culture ==
=== Legal status ===
Indications for co-trimoxazole
Indication	(United States) FDA-labelled indication?	(Australia) TGA-labelled indication?	(United Kingdom) MHRA-labelled indication?	Literature support
Acute infective exacerbation of COPD	Yes	No	No	Clinical trials are lacking.
Prophylaxis in HIV-infected individuals	No	No	No	Effective in one Ugandan study on morbidity, mortality, CD4-cell count, and viral load in HIV infection.
Otitis media	Pediatric population only	No	Yes	Clinical trials have confirmed its efficacy in chronic active and acute otitis media.
Travelers' diarrhea, treatment & prophylaxis	Yes	No	No	Clinical trials have confirmed its efficacy as a treatment for travellers' diarrhea.
Urinary tract infection	Yes	No	Yes	Clinical trials have confirmed its efficacy in this indication.
Bacterial infections
Acne vulgaris	No	No	No	At least one clinical trial supports its use in this indication.
Listeria	No	Yes	No	Well-designed clinical trials are lacking.
Melioidosis	No	Yes	No	Clinical trials have confirmed its efficacy, with or without adjunctive doxycycline; although, co-trimoxazole alone seems preferable.
Pertussis (whooping cough)	No	No	No	One Cochrane review supports its efficacy in preventing the spread of pertussis.
Shigellosis	Yes	Yes	No	Generally accepted treatment for shigellosis. A Cochrane review found that while it is an effective treatment for shigellosis it also produces more significant adverse effects than other antibiotic drugs.
Staphylococcus aureus infections	No	No	No	In vitro and in vivo activity against both non-resistant and methicillin-resistant Staphylococcus aureus (MRSA) infections.
Tuberculosis	No	No	No	In vitro and in vivo activity against both nonresistant and MDR strains of TB.
Whipple's disease	No	No	No	Co-trimoxazole is the recommended standard treatment for whipple's disease in some treatment protocols.
Fungal and protozoal infections
Isosporiasis	No	No	No	Clinical trials have confirmed its use in this indication.
Malaria	No	No	No	Clinical trials have confirmed its efficacy in both the treatment and prevention of malaria.
Pneumocystis jirovecii pneumonia	Yes	Yes	Yes	Its use as a prophylactic treatment is supported by one clinical trial involving children with acute lymphoblastic leukaemia. Other than this and one other clinical trial into its efficacy as a treatment for pneumocystis pneumonia, data on its use in both the treatment and prevention of pneumocystis pneumonia is significantly lacking.
Toxoplasmosis	Yes	Prevention only	Yes	Clinical trials have confirmed its prophylactic and therapeutic utility in cases of toxoplasmosis.

=== Brand names ===
Trimethoprim/sulfamethoxazole may be abbreviated as SXT, SMZ-TMP, TMP-SMX, TMP-SMZ, or TMP-sulfa. The generic British Approved Name (BAN) Co-trimoxazole is used for trimethoprim/sulfamethoxazole manufactured and sold by many different companies.

The following list of brand names is incomplete:

- Bactrim, Bactrimel (manufactured by Roche and distributed in Europe)
- Bactrom (Venezuela)
- Bibactin (manufactured by PPM and distributed in Cambodia and some African countries)
- Biseptol
- Sumetrolim
- Co-trimoxazole (used as generic UK name)
- Cotrim
- Deprim (AFT Pharmaceuticals)
- Diseptyl (Israel)
- Graprima Forte Kaplet (manufactured by PT Graha Farma and distributed in Indonesia)
- Infectrin, Bactrim (Brazil)
- Novo-Trimel
- Primadex (manufactured by Dexa Medica and distributed in Indonesia)
- Primotren (Lek in Slovenia and other countries)
- Resprim
- Sanprima (manufactured by Sanbe Farma and distributed in Indonesia)
- Septra (Aspen Pharmacare and formerly GlaxoSmithKline)
- Septram (Panama)
- Septran (GlaxoSmithKline)
- Septrin (Spain)
- Sulfatrim
- Teva-Trimel
- Trisul
- Vactrim (manufactured and distributed in Laos)

=== Economics ===
Trimethoprim/sulfamethoxazole is relatively inexpensive as of 2019.
