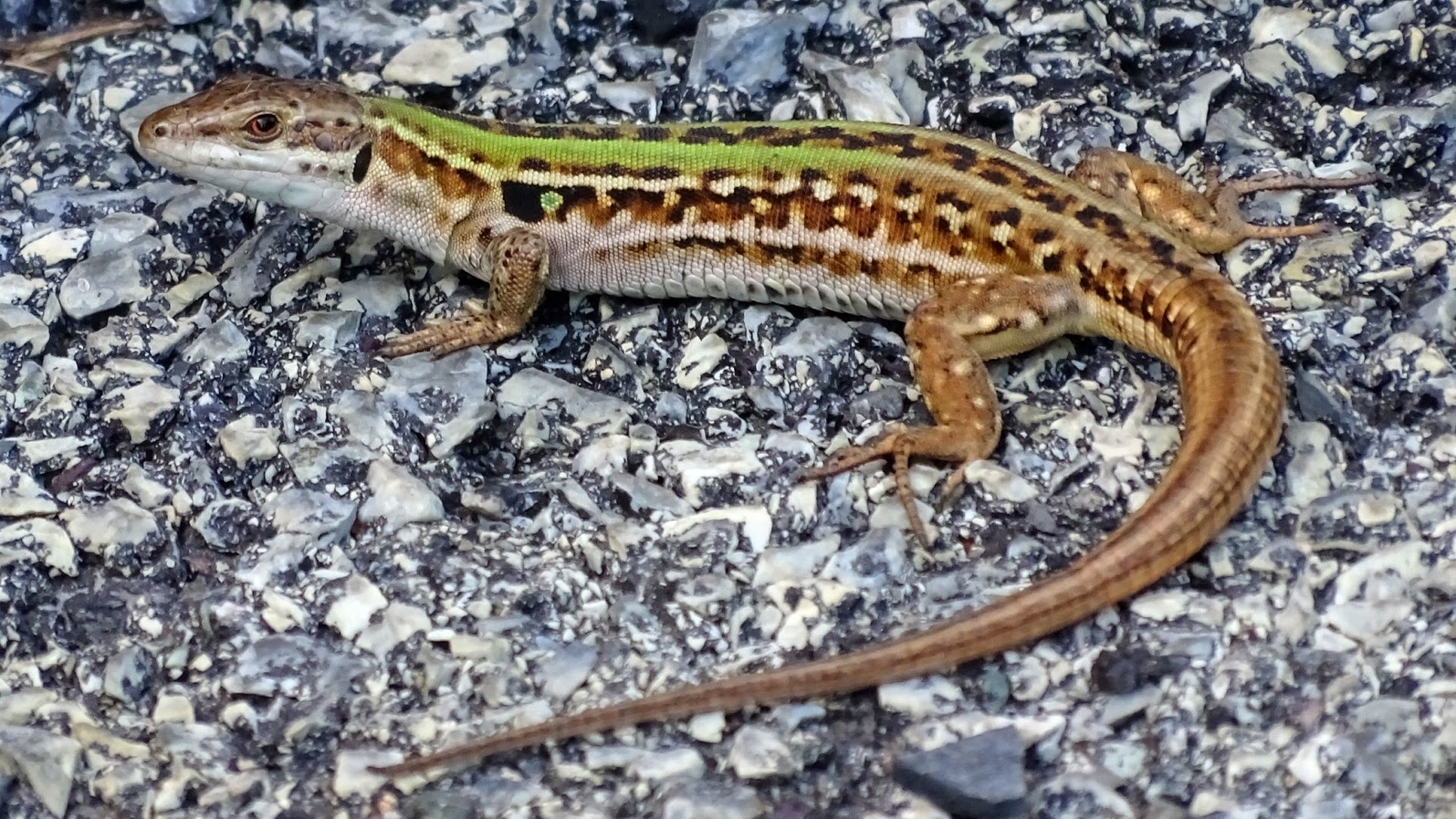
- An Italian wall lizard near the river Entella, in Italy

Conservation status
- Least Concern (IUCN 3.1)

Scientific classification
- Kingdom: Animalia
- Phylum: Chordata
- Class: Reptilia
- Order: Squamata
- Family: Lacertidae
- Genus: Podarcis
- Species: P. siculus

Binomial name
- Podarcis siculus (Rafinesque, 1810)

Synonyms
- Lacerta sicula Rafinesque, 1810

= Italian wall lizard =

Species of lizard

The Italian wall lizard or ruin lizard (Podarcis siculus, from the Greek meaning foot and agile), is a species of lizard in the family Lacertidae. P. siculus is native to southern and southeastern Europe, but has also been introduced elsewhere in the continent, as well as North America, where it is a possible invasive species. P. siculus is a habitat generalist and can thrive in natural and human-modified environments. Similarly, P. siculus has a generalized diet as well, allowing it to have its large range.

P. siculus is notable for having many subspecies within its large range. Studies evidence how rapidly P. siculus subspecies can become distinguishable from larger populations given geographic isolation. A 2008 study detailed distinct morphological and behavioral changes in a P. siculus population indicative of "rapid evolution".

P. siculus is a sexually dimorphic lizard species whose physical description varies across its subspecies, but it generally has a green or brown back and white or green belly. It is also oviparous, meaning females lay eggs, and they lay 3 or 4 clutches per year.

== Taxonomy ==
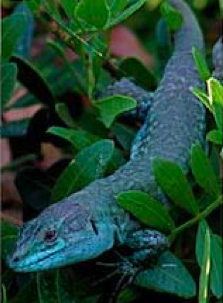
P. s. klemmeri - a blue morph found exclusively on the small island of Licosa

=== Subspecies and hybridization ===
P. siculus contains dozens of subspecies. Many different subspecies of P. siculus have been described, though some distinguished by very few morphological differences. Henle and Klaver (1986) described 52 subspecies of P. siculus. Podnar et al. (2005) described 6 groupings of P. siculus in the species' native range. The first clade is the Sicula clade, which includes Southwestern Calabria, Sardinia, and Sicily. The Monesterace clade includes the Istrian coast. The Cantazaro clade includes central Calabria. The Tuscany clade spans across Western Italy. The Suzac clade includes islands in southern and central Dalmatia. The final clade is the Campestris-sicula clade, which spans Northern Italy and the Adriatic Islands inhabited by P. siculus.

There have also been reports of hybridization between P. siculus and other species of the Podarcis genus, such as P. tiliguerta and P. raffonei.

=== "Island syndrome" and sources of phenotypic variation ===
Given the sheer number of subspecies of P. siculus and its vast geographic range, the evolutionary history of this species has been studied as case studies for certain evolutionary concepts. One such concept is "island effects," purported expansions of phenotypic range due to the availability of new niches. The evidence for island effects in reptiles, and lizards in particular, is not uniform or cohesive. A study evaluated the evidence of island effects among 30 island and 24 mainland populations of P. siculus for variation in head shape, size, and sexual dimorphism. Most of the disparities between sizes of individuals were explained by sexual dimorphism, though a low, but significant amount of centroid size variation could be attributed to being from a mainland versus an island population. Generally, individuals from island populations were smaller and had less sexually dimorphic body sizes. There was no connection between insularity and head shape sexual dimorphism, however insular head sizes were on average lower. These results complicate how P. siculus fits in with the island syndrome hypothesis, which posits that body and head sizes should be higher in insular populations. However, the island syndrome hypothesis also predicts a reduction in sexual dimorphism among insular populations, which was observed.

Another study that sought to understand causes of phenotypic variation among populations of P. siculus analyzed variation in head size, cranial musculature, and bite force. Using 16 populations, 14 from Adriatic Islands and two from mainland populations, the researchers found significant links between the ecology of the habitat occupied, bite force, and cranial musculature. For example, the consumption of mechanically resistant foods on islands with fewer sources of food was associated with stronger bite forces and musculature, along with increased sexual dimorphism in head dimensions. This study demonstrated that cranial musculature responds in predictable ways given similar ecological conditions. Population-level ecological pressures can result in the macroevolutionary emergence of variation between populations in P. siculus.

== Physical description ==
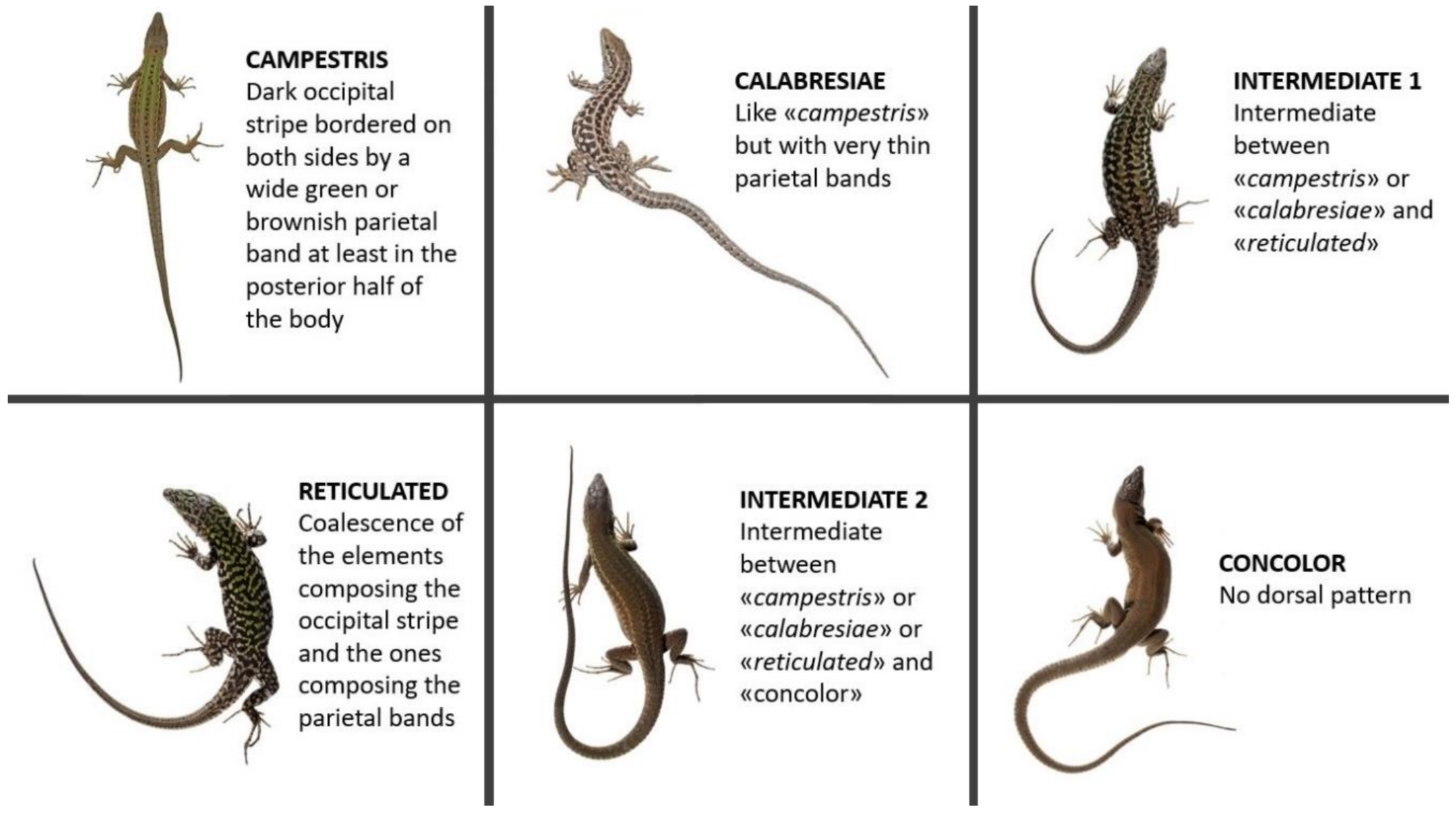
The six main Podarcis siculus dorsal pattern categories found in the Tuscan Archipelago

The snout–vent length of P. siculus is 150–250 mm (5.9–9.8 in) on average. P. siculus is characterized by a green or brown back with a white or green belly. There is variation in length and color diversity due to the many subspecies and populations of P. siculus. For example, some subspecies are melanic, meaning that parts of the back and belly have hints of blue. Such coloration is found on island populations of P. siculus rather than continental populations.

Head size is a sexually dimorphic trait, with males having larger heads and stronger jaws than females. It is hypothesized that this size difference is due in part to prey consumption needs in males and male–male aggression.

== Range ==
True to its name, P. siculus is native to Italy and is one of the most common lizards there. Its range also includes Bosnia and Herzegovina, Croatia, France, Montenegro, Serbia, Slovenia, and Switzerland, but it has also been introduced to Spain, Turkey, the United States, and Canada.

=== As an introduced species ===
Populations of P. siculus in North America have been documented from Topeka, Kansas; Long Island, New York; Greenwich, Connecticut; Levittown, Pennsylvania; Joplin, Missouri; and the Cincinnati area of Ohio, Indiana and Kentucky where P. siculus and P. muralis can both be found in very high concentrations and have become so well established that the Ohio Department of Natural Resources now classifies them as a resident species rather than an invasive species because they are so successful and have been present for so long. Although illegal, it is not uncommon for people in the Cincinnati area to "trade" P. muralis lizards with people who live in areas with high population of P. siculus (often making trades by live shipment in mail) and then releasing significant numbers of the lizards in their own yards and rock walls.

The species seems to be extending its range from an initial colonization event in western Long Island, presumably by using railroad tracks as dispersal corridors along the middle East Coast. Wall lizards seem to have colonized along the southwest Connecticut coast near Greenwich, as well as around Burlington County, New Jersey. There are some reports that these lizards descended from a group of lizards released in Mount Laurel in 1984. In 2020, a large number of P. s. campestris entered Great Britain as stowaways among shipments of grapes, before being intercepted.

P. siculus has also entered the Iberian Peninsula as an invasive species where it competes with the native Podarcis virescens species. Competition between the two lizard species has led to displacement of P. virescens lizards as they are outcompeted by P. siculus lizards.

== Habitat and ecology ==
P. siculus is a habitat generalist and thrives in many natural and human-modified environments. Habitats of P. siculus include forests, grasslands, shrublands, rocky areas, and farmland. It is able to live in such open habitats due to biological characteristics, such as high thermophily, which is the ability to thrive in high temperatures.

=== Diet ===
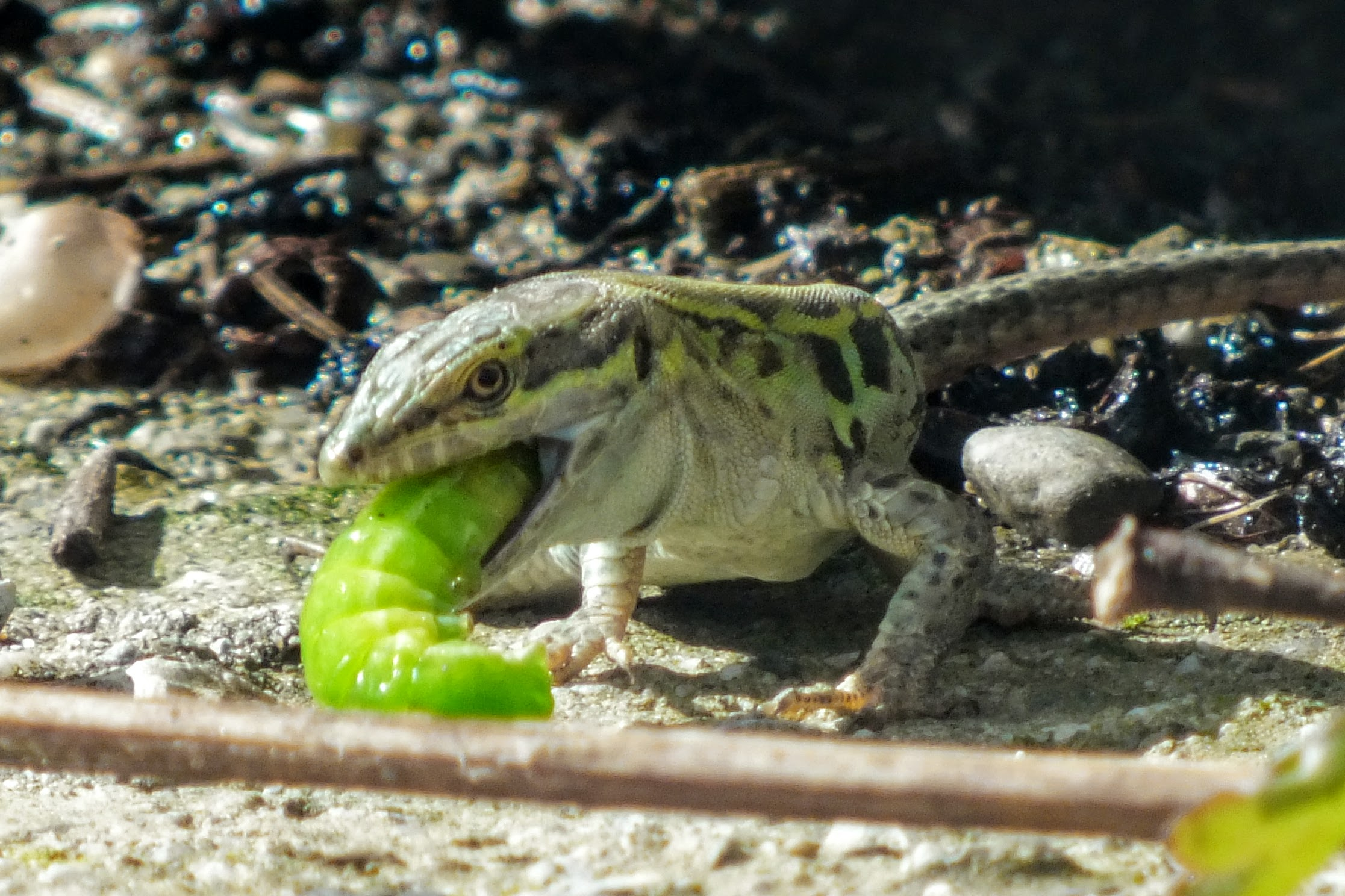
Italian wall lizard consuming a caterpillar

P. siculus is a generalist predator. Its diet consists of a wide variety of invertebrates, mainly arthropods. P. siculus predates on small vertebrates as well. Plant matter comprises a much greater percentage of the diet of P. siculus than other related lizards. There is also a disparity in diet diversity between the sexes, with males having a more diverse diet than females. Contrary to common ecological thought, there is little relationship between habitat area and diet diversity for P. siculus. Different levels of taxonomic prey diversity does not seem to affect the diversity of diets in different P. siculus populations, but insular populations of P. siculus do consume a greater percentage of plant matter as a part of their diet.

=== Predation ===
Predators of P. siculus include snakes, birds, and feral cats.

=== Reproduction ===
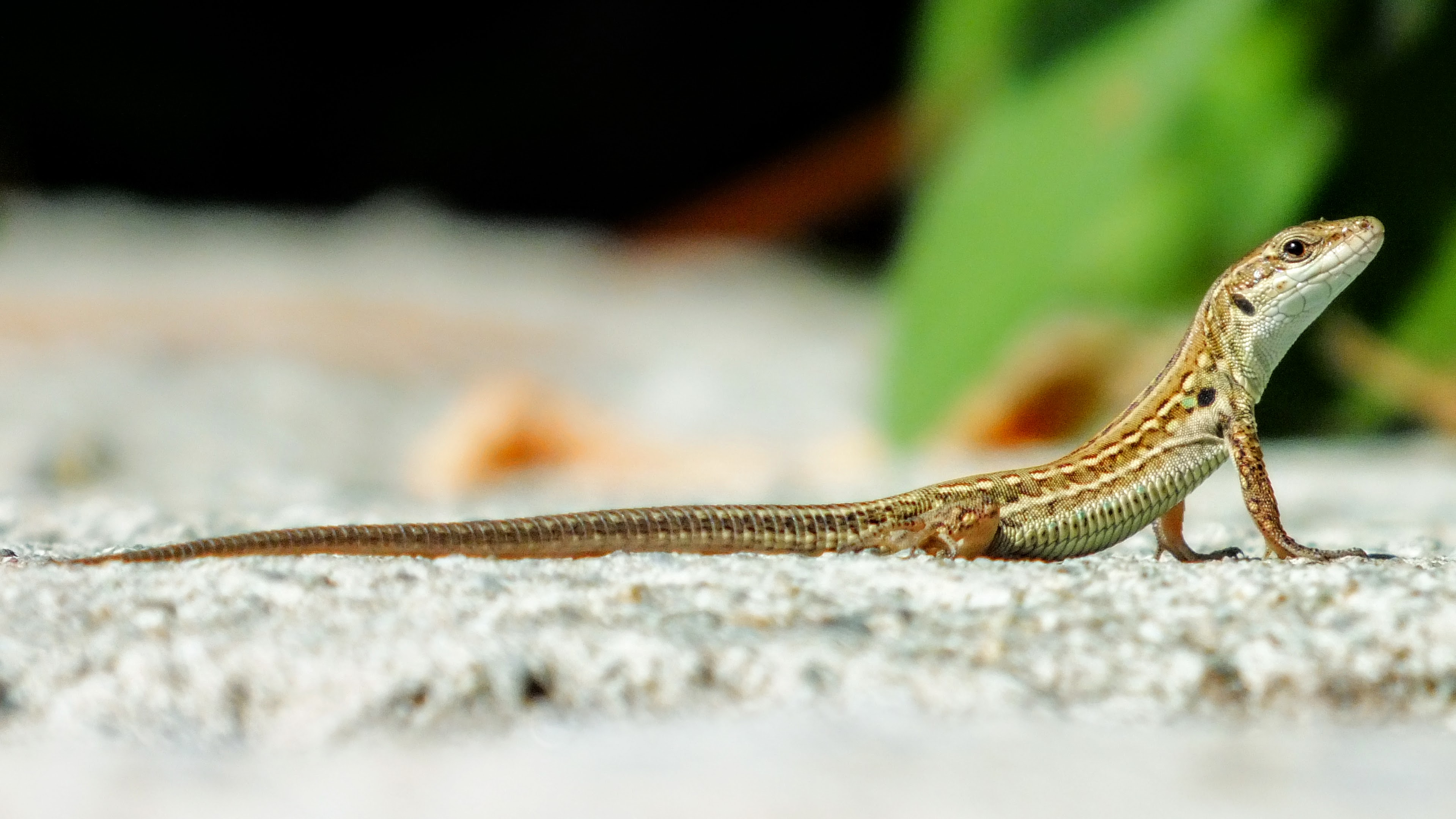
Juvenile

P. siculus is oviparous. Females can lay 3 or 4 clutches of 4-7 eggs per year. The number of eggs laid per clutch does vary by population. For example, populations on small islands of Croatia lay fewer eggs that hatch into larger offspring. The reproductive season of P. siculus begins in May and ends in July. Gravidity does not impose major physical burden upon females. Gravid females engage in more basking behavior than their non-gravid counterparts.

The activity of P450 in the brain of male P. siculus differs based on the reproductive stage of the individual. Importantly, P450 localizes to parts of the brain involved in reproductive and behavioral regulation. Thus, P450 is implied in the regulation of sexual behavior in P. siculus.

=== Disease ===
Parasites and bacteria are common among P. siculus and its various subspecies. Common bacterial species include Pantoea, Citrobacter, Morganella morganii, Pseudomonas aeruginosa, Coagulase-Negative Staphylococci, Enterobacter, E. coli, Schewanella, and Providencia. When tested, one out of ten isolated strains of Citrobacter were multidrug-resistant. Other isolated strains were antibiotic resistant as well.

Parasite species include pinworms, Ophionyssus natricus, coccidia, and Dicrocoelidae.

Some of the bacteria and parasites specific to continental populations of P. siculus have been identified to be zoonotic. Insular populations of P. siculus have similar levels of bacterial diversity to mainland populations.

Tick infestation of P. siculus can be common in man-made habitats. Tick infestation is generally more pronounced in large males, which may be a result of their increased home ranges. Tick load varies based on the type of environment that P. siculus inhabits. For example, females inhabiting traditionally-managed olive plantations have significantly higher tick loads than those residing in intensively-managed olive plantations.

=== Rapid adaptation ===
Video of hunting Italian wall lizard

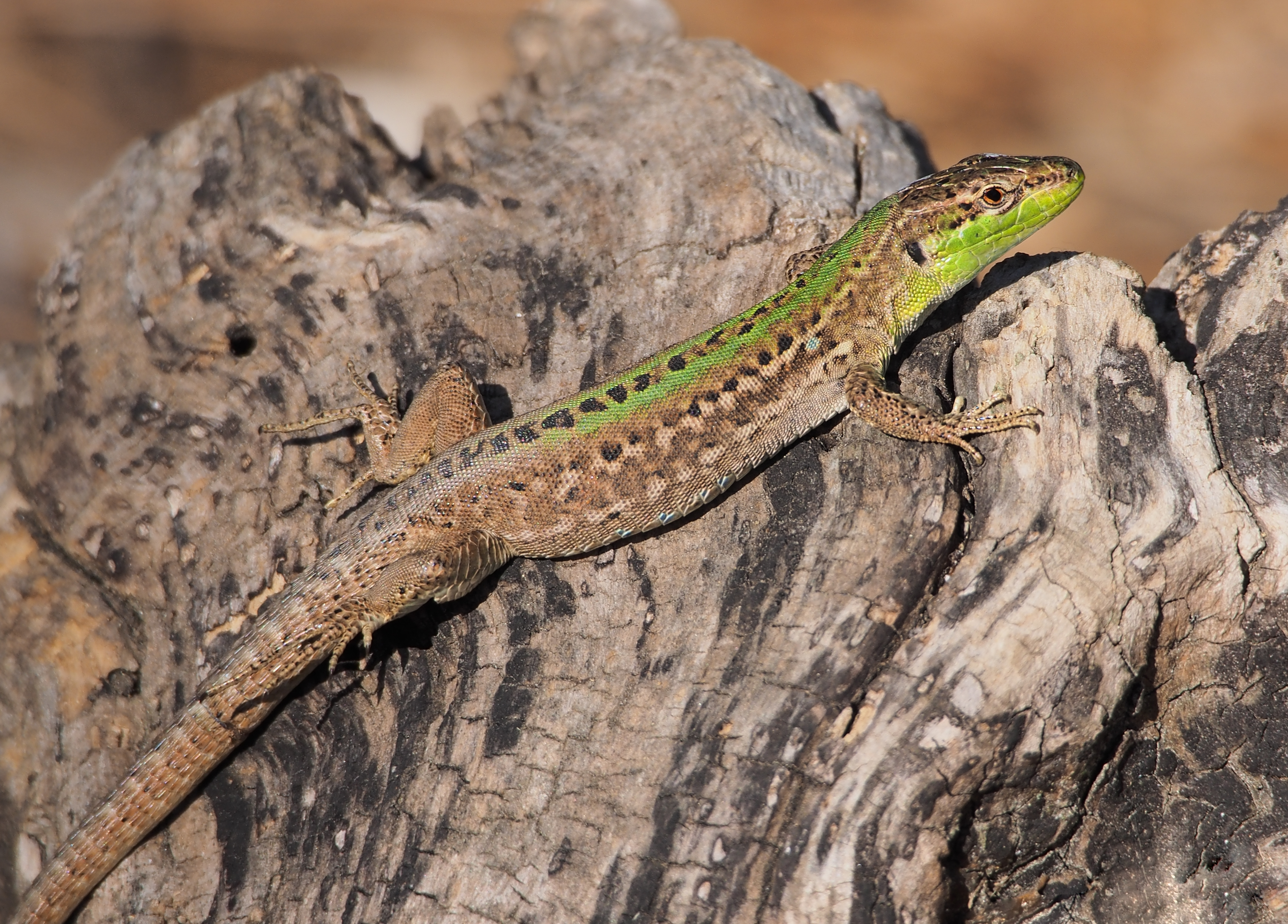
P. siculus taking morning sunbath

In 1971, 10 adult specimens (five breeding pairs) of P. siculus were transported from the Croatian island of Pod Kopište to the island Pod Mrčaru (about 3.5 km to the east). Both islands lie in the Adriatic Sea near Lastovo, where the lizards founded a new bottlenecked population. The two islands have similar size, elevation, microclimate, and a general absence of terrestrial predators and P. siculus expanded for decades without human interference, even outcompeting the (now locally extinct) Podarcis melisellensis population.

In the 1990s, scientists returned to Pod Mrčaru and found that the lizards currently occupying Mrčaru differ greatly from those on Kopište. While mitochondrial DNA analyses have verified that P. siculus specimens currently on Mrčaru are genetically very similar to the Kopište source population, the new Mrčaru population of P. siculus was described as having a larger average size, shorter hind limbs, lower maximal sprint speed, and altered response to simulated predatory attacks compared to the original Kopište population. These changes in morphology and behavior were attributed to "relaxed predation intensity" and greater protection provided by vegetation on Mrčaru.

In 2008, further analysis revealed that the Mrčaru population of P. siculus has significantly different head morphology (longer, wider, and taller heads) and increased bite force compared to the original Kopište population. This change in head shape corresponded with a shift in diet: Kopište P. siculus are primarily insectivorous, but those on Mrčaru eat substantially more plant matter. The changes in foraging style may have contributed to a greater population density and decreased territorial behavior of the Mrčaru population.

Another difference found between the two populations was the discovery, in the Mrčaru lizards, of cecal valves, which slow down food passage and provide fermenting chambers, allowing commensal microorganisms to convert cellulose to nutrients digestible by the lizards. Additionally, the researchers discovered that nematodes were common in the guts of Mrčaru lizards, but absent from Kopište P. siculus, which do not have cecal valves. The cecal valves, which occur in less than 1% of all known species of scaled reptiles, have been described as an "adaptive novelty, a brand new feature not present in the ancestral population and newly evolved in these lizards".

== Behavior ==
=== Feeding ===
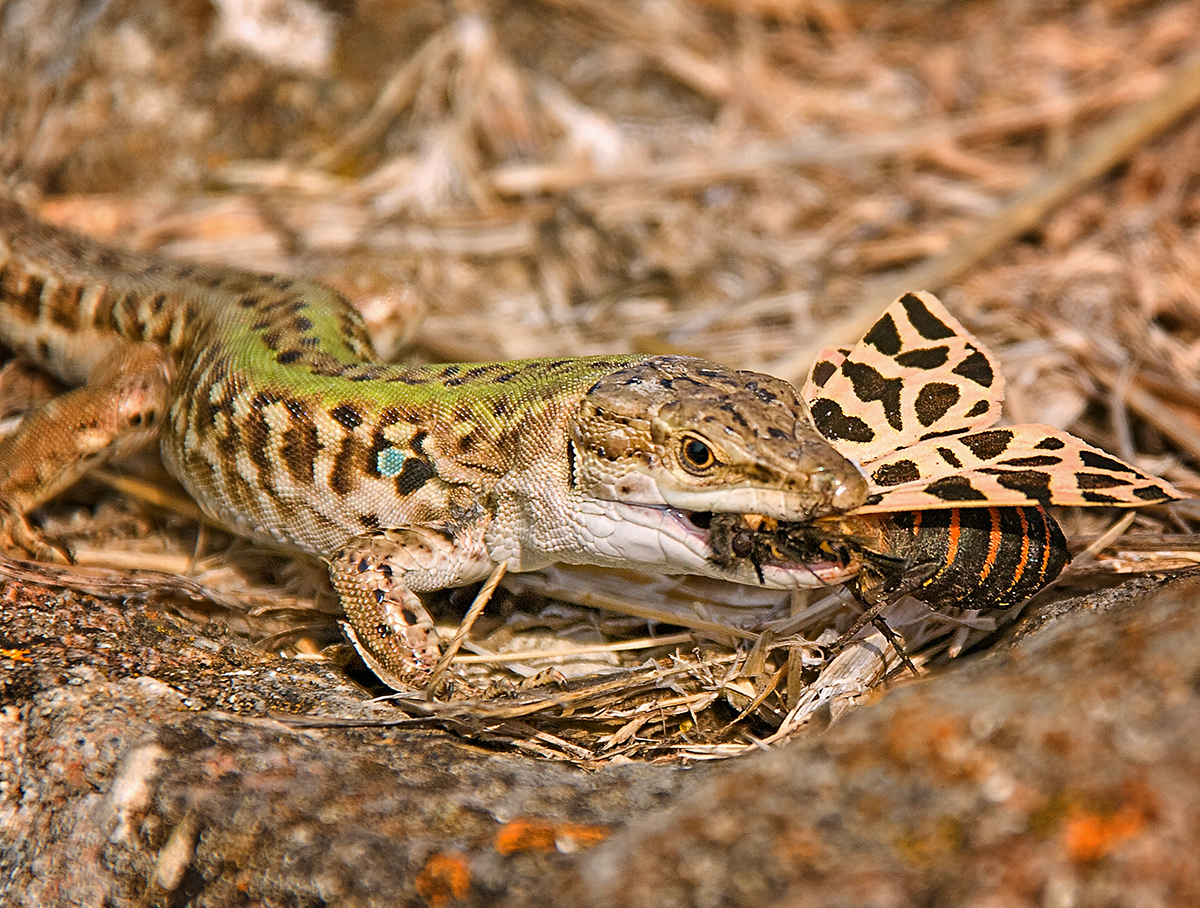
Italian wall lizard feeding on a moth

P. siculus has a strong preference for the consumption of non-conspicuous prey. Conspicuous coloration is a strong deterrent of consumption of carabid beetles. When consuming aposematic prey, P. siculus throws its head back and rubs its snout on the soil. Such behavior has been attributed to the unpalatability of aposematic prey. P. siculus is able to respond to chemical cues from some species of carabid beetles, evidence that the lizard has evolved to be able to detect the presence of dangerous chemicals in its prey.

Instances of extreme feeding behavior have been reported. One instance of cannibalism has been reported to have taken place between an adult male and a juvenile. The adult male captured the juvenile by biting down hard on his hips. An adult female has also been observed consuming a juvenile Hemidactylus turcicus in 2003, which is the first documented case of predation by P. siculus on a gecko. Additionally, an adult male has been observed feeding upon a dead adult Suncus etruscus in 2004. This is the first time P. siculus has been documented feeding upon the dead flesh of a small mammal.

=== Learning ===
Multiple experiments confirm the ability of P. siculus to learn a variety of different tasks. P. siculus can be trained to remove colored caps from food-containing pods. However, there is controversy over the ability of P. siculus to perform quantitative discrimination tasks. One experiment found that while 60% of subjects were able to distinguish between 1 and 4 items, very few were able to distinguish between 2 and 4 items, and none were able to distinguish between single objects with different surface areas. However, a previous study found that P. siculus was able to effectively discriminate between stimuli with different surface areas. This experiment did find that P. siculus was unable to discriminate between groups of food items of various quantities (1 food item, 2 food items, etc.). The ability of P. siculus to perform different quantitative discrimination tasks may be dependent on the type of stimuli, biological versus non-biological.

P. siculus has also been demonstrated to engage in social learning. An experiment that had P. siculus individuals observe others remove colored caps from a food containing pod demonstrated that those who observed others before attempting the task were more successful than those in the control group. It took longer for P. siculus observer to learn from demonstrators of a different species. That being said, P. siculus was still able to learn from a heterospecific demonstrator.

=== Aggression ===
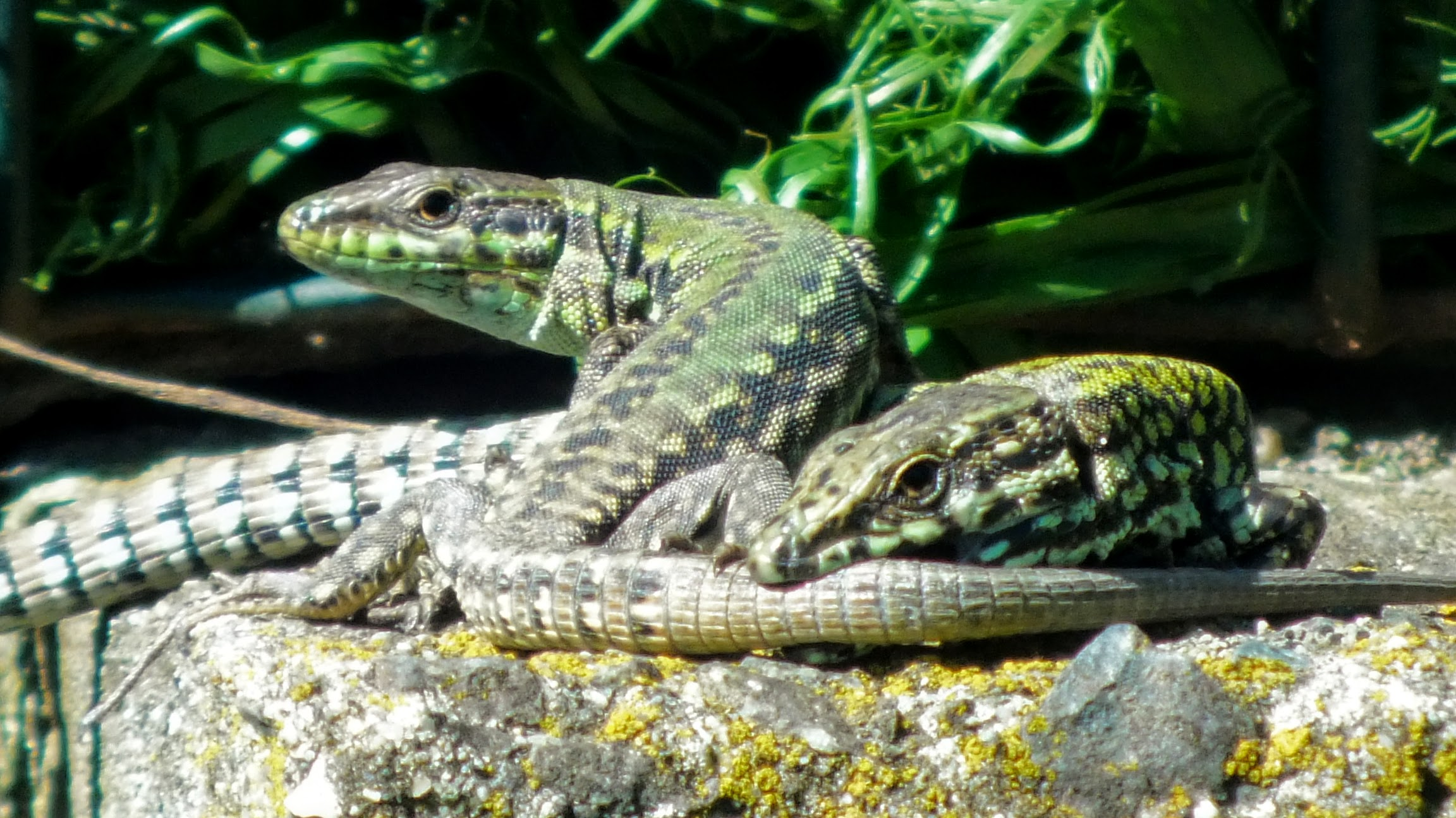
Italian wall lizard fighting a common wall lizard

The incidence of missing toes is extremely high in some populations of P. siculus, indicating a potentially high level of intraspecies competition. A 2009 study found that in one population of P. siculus on Croatian island Pod Mrčaru had significantly high rates of missing toes (55.48%). In this population, males were significantly more likely to have a missing toe than females. Additionally, members of the subpopulation facing higher levels of toe loss had significantly stronger bite forces than other populations of P. siculus. However, this study did not find significantly higher levels of predation between P. siculus on Pod Mrčaru and its counterparts elsewhere. The higher rates of toe loss among males combined with the higher population density of P. siculus on Pod Mrčaru suggests that intraspecific aggression may explain this disparity.

Additionally, a study has found that the more aggressive individual in a dyad spends more time basking than its less aggressive opponent. This relationship is prolonged: the individual that is more aggressive in a dyadic (one on one) encounter can make continued use of a thermally favorable environment over a long period of time. These more aggressive individuals grow faster than their less aggressive counterparts. In lizard dyads with low levels of aggression, there were smaller disparities between time spent basking. In such pairs, the two individuals may spend significant periods of time basking together. Regardless of aggression level in an initial encounter, this type of relationship was maintained between the dyad over a long period of time, demonstrating that social behavior is established quickly. However, basking behavior in isolation seemed to be replicated in the aftermath of these social encounters as well, suggesting that the relationship between sociality and basking depends on a more nuanced basis than behavior during an initial encounter.

=== Anti-predatory ===
P. siculus is able to detect chemical cues of common predators and modify its behaviors appropriately. P. siculus is also able to distinguish between scents of dangerous snakes and non-dangerous snakes. Studies have shown that P. siculus increase tongue-flicking behavior, commonly associated with stress, when exposed to predator scents. Similarly, experiments show that running behavior, tail-vibrating behavior, starting behavior, and stationary behavior all increase when P. siculus is exposed to predator scents than in control trials. Sudden, unpredictable starts may be more difficult to detect. Tail-waving may deflect attention of predators from the body of P. siculus to its tail.

Anti-predator behavior is mediated by the reproductive state of P. siculus. Gravid females display fewer tongue-flicks than their non-gravid counterparts when exposed to predator scents. Non-gravid females also spend significantly more time moving slowly when exposed to predator scents than their gravid counterparts. Gravid females also spend less time basking and spent more time being stationary when exposed to predator scents. Non-gravid females, on the other hand, increased the number of stand-ups and starts when exposed to predator scents. These results suggest that P. siculus balance the threat of predation while basking with the thermoregulatory needs of embryo development during gravidity. Increases in slow locomotion and stationary behavior may be ways of avoiding detection by predators.

Anti-predator behavior may also be different among the various subpopulations of P. siculus. Lizards from sub-populations facing greater threats of predation achieve higher maximal running speeds. These lizards also flee faster and further when presented with a predator threat than their counterparts that face lower levels of predation in their habitat. These behavioral and associated phenotypic changes in these two subpopulations arose rather quickly, highlighting the ability of P. siculus for rapid adaptation. Anti-predator behavior may also differ based on the lived environment of P. siculus. A 2009 study compared anti-predator behavior in P. siculus juveniles collected from olive tree plantations and vineyards. Juveniles from the olive tree plantations responded to a simulated predator threat by escaping towards an olive tree instead of running and stopping in a temporary refuge, despite the increase in distance traversed. Juveniles from vineyards instead ran short distances, stopped in a temporary refuge, then ran again.

=== Light polarization ===
Animals can use the polarization of light to determine their orientation. The polarization of light affects orientation behavior in a variety of species, and has been demonstrated to be the mode of orientation for P. siculus. P. siculus can learn a training direction when operating under white polarized light with the direction of the electric field parallel to the training axis. Under blue and cyan light, P. siculus is able to correctly orient itself under polarization axes both parallel and perpendicular to the training axis. Red light polarization completely disoriented P. siculus under experimental conditions. Additionally, there is evidence that P. siculus has a time-compensated celestial compass. The time-compensated mechanism does not seem to be affected by whether or not the sun is in view.

=== Effect of habitat on behavior ===
A 2005 study compared seasonal and diel behaviors of an introduced population of P. siculus to its Italian counterparts. The activity period of P. siculus campestris was reduced compared to P. siculus in Rome, where lizards are active year-round. Colder mean temperatures in the New York habitat of P. siculus campestris may explain why this population's activity is limited to the months of April through October. P. siculus campestris was also active for fewer hours during the day compared to its Roman counterparts. The photoperiod of Long Island, New York, the home of P. siculus campestris, is similar to that of Rome. This similarity strengthens the argument for temperature explaining the discrepancy in activity levels.

== Conservation status ==
The Italian wall lizard is listed as being of least concern by the International Union for Conservation of Nature (IUCN) on the IUCN Red List. Its current population numbers are increasing.

=== Pesticide exposure ===
Because P. siculus is commonly found in agricultural areas, there is a concern about the effects of pesticide exposure on their health and reproductive capabilities. A 2021 study assessing biomarkers in P. siculus on conventional and organic farms found that those on conventional farms (and therefore likely exposed to pesticides) had higher levels of oxidative stress, indicating that P. siculus can quickly activate antioxidant systems to counteract reactive oxygen species (ROS) formation. Free radical damage was much higher in pesticide-exposed individuals than control and organic lizards. Gravid females exposed to pesticides also lay larger, worse-quality eggs than control gravid females. Hatchling locomotion ability does not seem to be affected by maternal pesticide exposure. Also, it was found that some commonly used agricultural pesticides are either not neurotoxic to P. siculus or that the organism is capable of resisting the studied chemical's neurotoxicity, and that the P. siculus immune system was not significantly affected by the studied pesticides.

== See also ==
- List of reptiles of Italy
