= Morganella =

Morganella may refer to:

== Surname ==
- Michel Morganella (born 1989), Swiss footballer
- Michele Morganella (born 1986), Italian footballer

== Taxonomic genera ==
- Morganella (bacterium), a genus of bacteria containing the single species Morganella morganii
- Morganella (fungus), a genus of puffball fungi in the family Agaricaceae
- Morganella (insect), a scale insect genus in the family Diaspididae
- Morganella (brachiopod), a Devonian period brachiopod in the family Araksalosiidae

== See also ==
- Morganiella, a genus of small flies in the family Mycetophilidae
