= ESCAPPM =

Mnemonic in microbiology

ESCAPPM or ESCHAAPPM is a mnemonic for a group of gram-negative bacteria with inducible beta-lactamase activity that is chromosomally mediated.

- E: Enterobacter spp.
- S: Serratia spp.
- C: Citrobacter freundii
- H: Hafnia spp.
- A: Acinetobacter spp.
- A: Aeromonas spp.
- P: Proteus spp. (excluding P. mirabilis)
- P: Providencia spp.
- M: Morganella morganii

In vitro sensitivities are not applicable in vivo.

In general, treatment with cephalosporins results in induction of AmpC beta-lactamase. Treatment with an aminoglycoside or carbapenem is usually indicated. Carbapenems are a class of beta-lactam antibiotics with a broad spectrum of antibacterial activity. They have a structure that renders them highly resistant to beta-lactamases. Examples of carbapenems include meropenem and imipenem.
