= Purple urine bag syndrome =

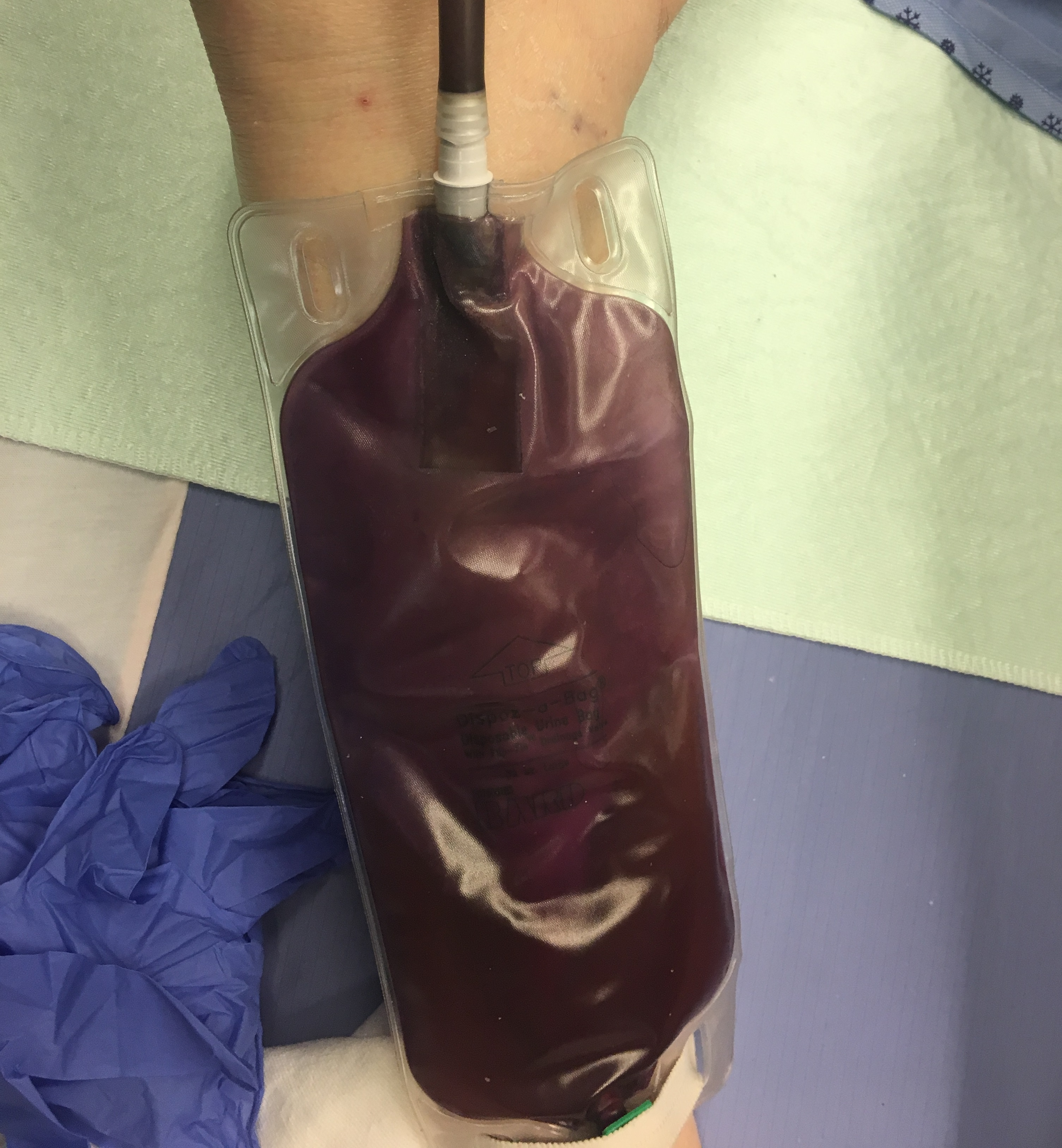
- Purple urine bag syndrome usually presents as a purplish discoloration of a catheterized person's collection bag.

Purple urine bag syndrome (PUBS) is a medical syndrome where purple discoloration of urine collection bag occurs in people with urinary catheters and co-existent urinary tract infections. PUBS is most prevalent in elderly females with constipation. Constipation alters the gut bacteria, reducing gastrointestinal motility and leading to increased growth of bacteria in the colon. High bacterial counts in urine are the most important factor causing purple urine bag syndrome. Bacteria in urine produce the enzyme indoxyl sulfatase. This converts indoxyl sulfate in the urine into the red and blue colored compounds indirubin and indigo. People with urinary tract infections using catheters will increase the conversion of indoxyl sulfate to indirubin and indigo. Indirubin dissolves in plastic and therefore causes urine discoloration. The purple discoloration is the result of reaction between indirubin and plastic urine bags, as well as the presence of indigo.

Bacteria in the urine can be found through bacteria culture test. People with purple urine bag syndrome may present with elevated bacterial loads on their culture tests when compared to those who are not affected by this syndrome. The most commonly implicated bacteria are Providencia stuartii, Providencia rettgeri, Klebsiella pneumoniae, Proteus mirabilis, Escherichia coli, Morganella morganii, and Pseudomonas aeruginosa. Purple urine bag syndrome treatment should aim for underlying issues rather than the condition itself. The purple discoloration is harmless and can be resolved with treatments targeted to specific bacteria or any underlying medical conditions. Treatment also consists of providing comfort to both patients and their family, administering antibiotics and performing regular catheter changes. The prognosis is good, however, the morbidity and mortality rates associated with PUBS are elevated depending on patient's underlying health status.

== Signs and symptoms ==
People with purple urine bag syndrome usually do not complain of any symptoms. Purple discoloration of urine bag is often the only finding, frequently noted by caregivers. It is usually considered a benign condition, although in the setting of recurrent or chronic urinary tract infection, it may be associated with drug-resistant bacteria.

Purple urine bag syndrome is an asymptomatic condition, however, symptoms of urinary tract infections may be similar to those of purple urine bag syndrome. Some signs and symptoms of urinary tract infection may include abdominal pain, pain during urination, fever or chills, nausea or vomiting, and an increased frequency of urination.

== Pathophysiology ==
Tryptophan (chemical structure shown above) is converted into indole (seen on the right) by bacteria in the gut.

Purple urine bag syndrome (PUBS) is thought to be caused by tryptophan from the diet being metabolized by bacteria in the gastrointestinal tract to produce indole. Indole is absorbed into the blood by the intestine and passes to the liver. There, indole is converted to indoxyl sulfate, which is then excreted in the urine. In purple urine bag syndrome, bacterial enzymes that colonize the urinary catheter, specifically sulfatases and phosphatases, convert indoxyl sulfate to the colored compounds indirubin and indigo. When oxidized, indirubin becomes a reddish color while indigo becomes blue. Combined, they react with the plastics in the polyvinylchloride (PVC) in the catheter bag and create the signature purple seen in PUBS.

The change in tryptophan metabolism is theorized to be due to diminished gut motility resulting in prolonged transit times. The additional time will lead to a bacterial overgrowth in the bowel. The overabundance of bacterial will facilitate the conversion of tryptophan into indole.

PUBS has also been linked to long term laxative use. A common side effect of overuse of laxatives is damage to the colorectal mucosal lining and changes to the normal intestinal microbiota. This will once again allow bacteria to accumulate and facilitate tryptophan conversion.

The most common bacteria found to be responsible are Providencia stuartti and rettgeri, Proteus mirabilis, Pseudomonas auruginosa, Klebsiella pneumoniae, Escherichia coli, Morganella, and citrobacter species, Enterococci, and Group B Streptococci.

== Causes and risk factors ==
Many risk factors can increase how likely it is for someone to develop a urinary tract infection. While using a catheter for a prolonged period of time is a potential risk factor, some other risk factors for a urinary tract infection include being female, constipation, and chronic renal failure. Pregnant women are also at higher risk of developing UTIs.

Purple urine bag syndrome can be a side effect of having a urinary tract infection while using a catheter for a long period of time. A catheter is a small, flexible tube that can be inserted into a patient's bladder by a medical professional to allow the patient to easily and constantly empty their bladder. This is commonly used before/after surgeries, for those who have a blockage preventing them from urinating, to assist those with bladder weakness that is impacting their ability to urinate, etc. While a patient has a catheter inserted, the chemicals produced by their body can react with the chemicals in the tubing and bag of the catheter.

Purple urine bag syndrome has greater prevalence among those who have trouble with making bowel movements or are dehydrated (lacking adequate fluid). It is also associated with longer periods using a catheter. Other significant risk factors include being female, being elderly, and/or being immobile, which refers to the inability to move.

=== Bacteria that may cause purple urine bag syndrome ===
The exact bacteria that causes purple urine bag syndrome has not been confirmed but there are some bacteria that have been reported as potential causes. These include Proteus mirabilis, Pseudomonas aeruginosa, Klebsiella, Escherichia coli, Enterococci, and Group B Streptococci. Studies are still being done into each of these bacteria but below is a brief summary of some of the lesser known bacteria.

P. mirabilis can be contracted in the community and in hospitals. This bacteria was isolated from chicken carcasses found in a slaughterhouse in southern Brazil. It was found in the feces of chicken which led researchers to believe that it is naturally found in the digestive tract of chickens. As such, it is difficult to control as it is naturally produced and transferred within slaughterhouses and has the potential for a lot of cross-contamination. During the processing and storage processes that are used within these facilities, most of the bacteria will not survive. However, it is important that these facilities use clean tools that have been properly disinfected when handling and processing the meat to avoid any accidental transmission. This bacteria is considered a commensal (a bacteria that lives on the body without causing any harm to human health) but it has been known to cause occasional infections. Urinary tract infections are the most common type of infection cause by P. mirabilis.

P. aeruginosa is a bacteria that was first discovered due to its ability to cause the surgical dressings and bandages of patients to turn a blue/green color. It can be found in a variety of natural environments including soil and water and on human skin and oral mucosa. This bacteria can also be found in man made environments such as hot tubs and humidifiers and hospital environments such as respirators and sinks. As a result, there are numerous opportunities for infection and they can be hard to control once they begin to spread. This bacteria is especially dangerous for those who are immunocompromised (people who have a condition that causes the ability of their body's natural immune system to be decreased so their body's have a more difficult time fighting infections and diseases). The most common illnesses caused by P. aeruginosa include sepsis (a condition that causes the body to have an extreme and improper reaction to an infection), pneumonia (a condition that involves inflammation in the lungs), and other respiratory conditions but urinary tract infections are also a known affiliate.

Klebsiella is a bacteria that is similarly found in nature, the community, and healthcare environments. It became of particular interest to the global community when the number of infections rose and numerous strains became resistant to antibiotic treatment. This was particularly concerning because it makes it very difficult for medical professionals to treat patients with infections caused by Klebsiella. Additionally, the bacteria contains many genes known to cause antibiotic-resistance and it can spread it to certain other bacteria. Eventually, this opens the door for the emergence of an untreatable infection that has already been isolated by some labs. The most common illnesses caused by Klebsiella include pneumonia, urinary tract infections, and bloodstream infections.

E.coli is one of the most widely studied bacteria by scientists and it has significantly contributed to our understanding of modern genetics. It can be found in fecal matter and as such, is often used to measure water quality. Humans can be infected from a multitude of sources in the community including eating food that has been contaminated. E. coli has the ability to cause a wide variety of illnesses in humans including diarrhea, sepsis, meningitis (inflammation of the membranes surrounding the brain and spinal cord), and urinary tract infections.

== Diagnosis ==
Purple urine bag syndrome can be diagnosed by medical professionals based on a patient's medical history, symptoms, and the results of their laboratory tests. This is a relatively rare diagnosis that is usually sparked by patients and healthcare providers noticing that a patient's urine collection bag from a catheter has become discolored and turned a purple hue. Upon visual inspection, the patient's urine is typically still clear and has no discoloration. From there, the patient's urine will be tested for its pH (determining whether the urine is more or less acidic than normal) and leukocyte count (Leukocytes are also called white blood cells. By measuring a person's number of leukocytes, medical professionals can tell if a patient has inflammation). If the patient's urine has an above average number of leukocytes, indicating inflammation, and a pH above the normal range of 5.5 to 7.5, indicating a urinary tract infection or other kind of infection, they can be diagnosed with purple urine bag syndrome.

== Prognosis ==
Purple urine bag syndrome (PUBS) is typically benign and harmless despite its distressing presentation. However, it is important to treat PUBS immediately in order to stop progression to more dangerous conditions. Cases of PUBS have resulted in death. This occurs because untreated PUBS can lead to sepsis. It was found that women with leukocytosis who present with shock and also have diabetes and uremia are at a higher risk of mortality from PUBS. PUBS has also been documented to have progressed to Fournier's gangrene, a rare but deadly necrotising bacterial infection.

== Treatment ==
The molecular structure of cefuroxime, an antibiotic used in treatment of purple urine bag syndrome

Purple urine bag syndrome is generally harmless and usually does not require immediate treatment unless it has progressed to a serious state.^{[contradicts earlier recommendation in "Prognosis"?]}Those who are immunocompromised in particular tend to be more susceptible to the effects of the condition. If serious, PUBS is generally treated with antibiotics, and the underlying issue is addressed.

One case considers an elderly woman with limited mobility due to a previous fracture. She was put on a catheter, a tube that provides recovering hospital patients with fluids and nutrients. The woman was treated with one class of antibiotics, cefuroxime, by mouth. She was later transitioned over to two different antibiotics, ceftriaxone and gentamicin, by intravenous injection (delivering important compounds such as nutrients and medications into the bloodstream by catheter).

The woman had significant trouble defecating, a risk factor for the development of purple urine bag syndrome.

Another case focuses on a middle aged Pakistani woman's development of purple urine bag syndrome. The woman was given cefixime, a class of antibiotic, by mouth. She was only given oral medications and not switched to intravenous injections of antibiotics. She did not receive the same antibiotics that the first patient did. She was continued on the antibiotic for a little over a week, and her UTI issue was revisited ten days after completing the treatment; by that time, her symptoms had completely resolved.

This second woman exhibited several risk factors such as enduring constipation (a long-lasting health issue of decreased excretion of fecal matter), use of a catheter for an extended period of time, as well as being female.

The final case is of purple urine bag syndrome in an elderly woman with dementia. She experienced frequent symptoms, and the potential underlying cause was surmised to be a urinary tract infection. To treat her, she was given oral antibiotics each time. The medical team also changed her urinary catheter and bag. After the changes, her purple urinary bag syndrome was at least temporarily resolved. After coming to a facility, the woman was started on the antibiotic cefixime, by mouth, and was prescribed lactulose to relieve her constipation. By the last follow-up visit, the woman's symptoms appeared to have stopped.

== Prevention ==
Urinary tract infections are caused by the accumulation of bacteria in the urinary system which includes the bladder and kidneys. Purple urine bag syndrome typically occurs as a result of bacterial infections. Thus, taking precautions against the development of bacterial infections can minimize the risk of purple urine bag syndrome.

It is helpful to consistently change the catheter and drainage bag, which is a bag that receives urine from the catheter, in order to inhibit the formation of harmful bacteria that can cause this condition of purple discoloration of the urine.

In pregnant women, the development of UTIs can be quite dangerous; thus, it is highly advised for pregnant women to seek immediate care if experiencing significant signs and symptoms of a UTI.

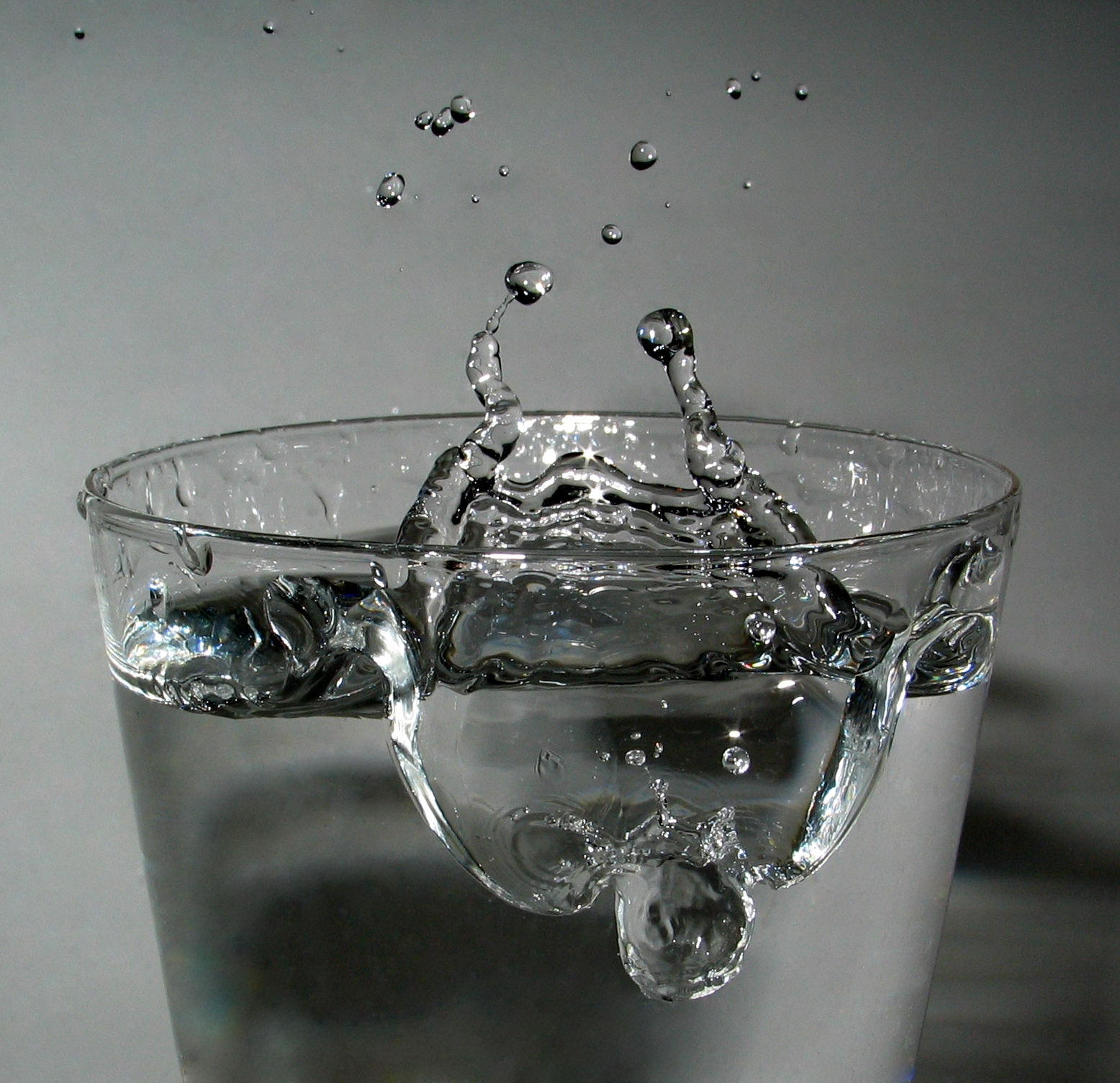
Drinking water can help prevent the development of UTIs that promote the growth of bacteria involved in purple urine bag syndrome.

To prevent bacterial infections like UTIs that can lead to purple urinary bag syndrome, it is advised to drink lots of water and avoid consuming things like sugar, caffeine, and alcohol. There is some research that points to cranberry pills as a means of reducing the occurrence of UTIs, while cranberry juice has too much sugar to be as beneficial as the cranberry pill. For healthier bowel movements, it is encouraged to promote gut health, by doing certain activities like exercising and consuming lots of fluids and fiber. It is also recommended to frequently use the restroom to clear the bladder, urinate after sexual intercourse, and wipe thoroughly to prevent the spread of bacteria to the genitals; all of these tips will ultimately prevent the development of UTIs and decrease the likelihood of attaining purple urine bag syndrome. Some sources note that taking probiotics can help with promoting the growth of good bacteria and edging out the bad bacteria involved in UTIs.

== Epidemiology ==
Purple urine bag syndrome is more prevalent among the elderly population. From October 1980 to August 2016, reported PUBS cases were analyzed in a systemic review to make comparisons between patient age, gender, co-morbidities, vital signs, laboratory test results, and mortality. In particular, the parameters that were evaluated were urine pH value, presence of fever, shock, WBC count, constipation, and co-morbidities like diabetes and uremia. The results from data analysis highlighted how PUBS was more commonly observed in elderly, as shown by how 98 out of 116 PUBS cases (84.5%) were elderly, as in over age 65.

Furthermore, PUBS is more common in female nursing home residents. Other risk factors include alkaline urine, constipation, and polyvinyl chloride catheter use. According to clinical studies, the average age of PUBS patients was about 79 years old, and 70.7% of these patients were female. The most common risk factors were alkaline urine and constipation: 91.3% of PUBS patients reported high prevalence of alkaline urine, while 90.1% reported constipation.

A particular case report was revolving around a home-dwelling elderly female with a lumbar compression fracture. From this case report, it was confirmed that the following are primary risk factors for PUBS: female gender, increased dietary tryptophan (ex. bananas, meat), long-term immobilization and catheterization, severe constipation, high urinary bacterial load, and renal failure. All in all, PUBS may appear to be harmless especially when patients are asymptomatic, but it can require intensive management to treat. A case of PUBS can be indicative of an ongoing urinary tract infection, which can further worsen into a serious health threat in addition to any other existing health conditions a patient may have.

== History ==
This syndrome was first described by Barlow and Dickson in 1978. PUBS has commonly been found among patients with long-term urinary catheters, those that are bedridden, diagnosed with chronic kidney disease (CKD), or has chronic constipation. The most common related condition to PUBS would be urinary tract infections (UTIs).

In 1812, King George III of England was reported to have a bluish tinge in his urine and bouts of constipation. Along with the King's many other illnesses, this discolored urine lead to the diagnosis of acute porphyria.

In the first two PUBS patient cases in 1978 and 2003, it was reported that the patients had a purple-colored urine bag for a long period of time ranging from hours to days, after their urinary catheterization. A specific patient case involved an 85-year-old female living in nursing home with a long-term urinary catheter, who had been experiencing urine discoloration of violet-colored urine over the past 4 weeks. This rare phenomenon was centered around this patient that had a history of recurrent UTIs, and was admitted for initial diagnosis of UTI and constipation. The patient was given the following medication regimen: oral cefuroxime, then changed to ceftriaxone IV and gentamicin IV, and oral glycerol for constipation. The Foley catheter was replaced, the purple urine disappeared, and the urinalysis was sterile; as a result, the patient was discharged in stable conditions.
