= Qing Dai (traditional Chinese medicine) =

Qingdai (青黛) or Qing Dai, a traditional Chinese medicine, is derived from dried leaves and stems of Baphicacanthus cusia (Nees) Bremek., Polygonum tinctorium Ait., or Isatis indigotica Fortune (Fort.).

Qingdai was first recorded in Yaoxinglun.

== See also ==
- Indirubin
- Realgar/Indigo naturalis
- Indigo naturalis
