= PUBS =

PUBS may refer to:

- Percutaneous umbilical cord blood sampling
- Purple urine bag syndrome
