= Qing Dai =

Qing Dai may refer to:

- Qing Dai (traditional Chinese medicine)
- Qing dynasty (Chinese: 清代; pinyin: Qīng Dài), Manchu-led dynasty of China
- Dai Qing (born 1941), Chinese writer
