= C16H10N2O2 =

The molecular formula C_{16}H_{10}N_{2}O_{2} (molar mass: 262.27 g/mol, exact mass: 262.0742 u) may refer to:

- Indigo dye
- Indirubin
