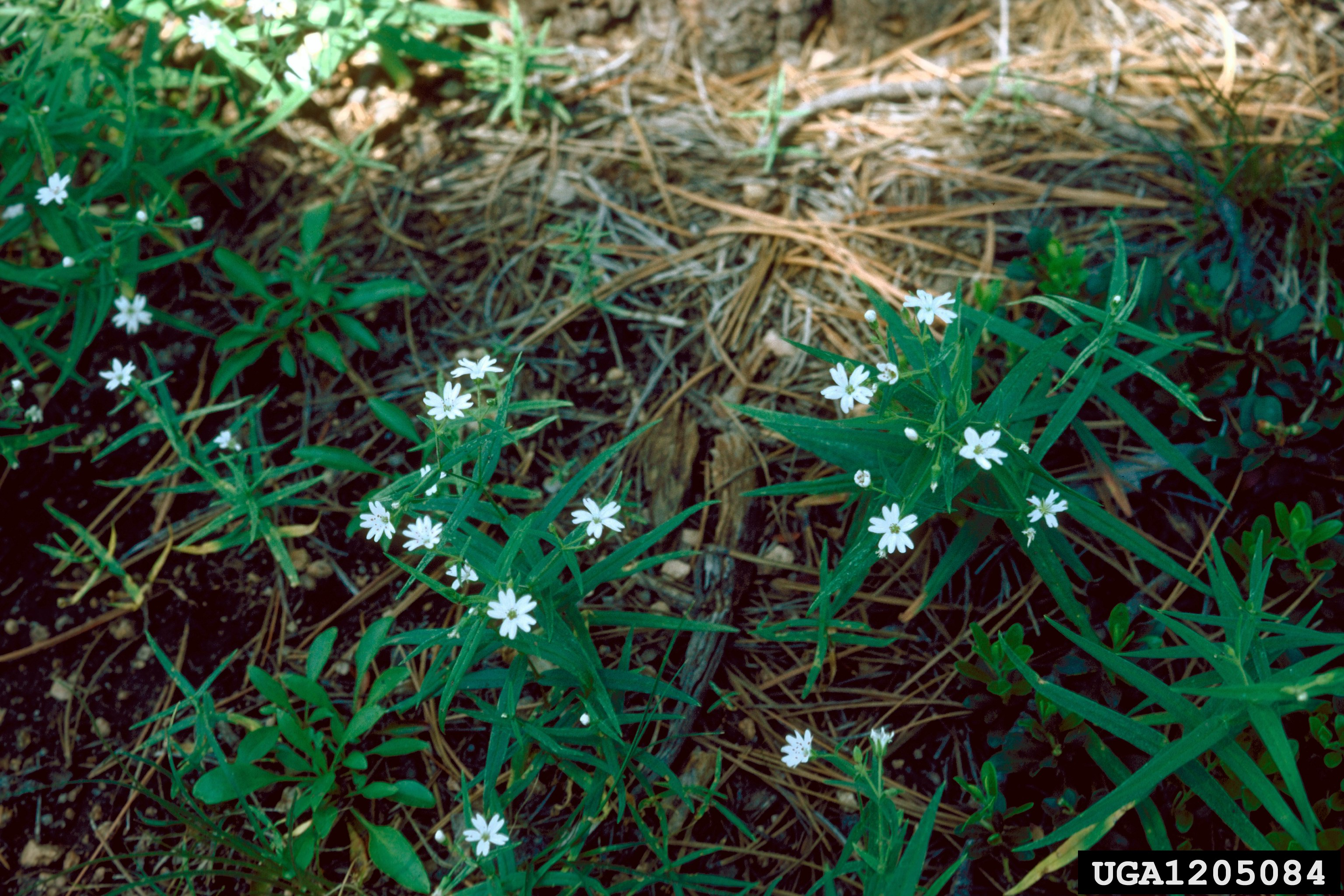
- Pseudostellaria jamesiana

Scientific classification
- Kingdom: Plantae
- Clade: Tracheophytes
- Clade: Angiosperms
- Clade: Eudicots
- Order: Caryophyllales
- Family: Caryophyllaceae
- Genus: Pseudostellaria; Pax

Species
- 24

Synonyms
- Krascheninikovia Turcz. ex Fenzl

= Pseudostellaria =

Genus of flowering plants

Pseudostellaria is a genus of flowering plants in the family Caryophyllaceae. Most of the 20 species occur in Asia. They are similar to Stellaria, differing in the morphology of the roots, fruit capsules and shallower notches of the petals.

== Species ==
The following species are recognised in the genus Pseudostellaria:

- Pseudostellaria baekdusanensis M.Kim
- Pseudostellaria × biseulsanensis M.Kim & H.Jo
- Pseudostellaria bohyeonsanensis M.Kim & H.Jo
- Pseudostellaria cashmiriana Schaeftl.
- Pseudostellaria davidi (Franch.) Pax
- Pseudostellaria ebracteata (Kom.) N.S.Pavlova
- Pseudostellaria europaea Schaeftl.
- Pseudostellaria helanshanensis W.Z.Di & Y.Ren
- Pseudostellaria heterantha (Maxim.) Pax
- Pseudostellaria heterophylla (Miq.) Pax - false starwort
- Pseudostellaria himalaica (Franch.) Pax
- Pseudostellaria japonica (Korsh.) Pax
- Pseudostellaria okamotoi Ohwi
- Pseudostellaria palibiniana (Takeda) Ohwi
- Pseudostellaria polymorpha Y.S.Lian
- Pseudostellaria retusa (Ohwi) Y.S.Lian
- Pseudostellaria rigida (Kom.) Pax
- Pseudostellaria rupestris (Turcz.) Pax
- Pseudostellaria × segeolsanensis M.Kim & H.Jo
- Pseudostellaria × seoraksanensis M.Kim & H.Jo
- Pseudostellaria setulosa Ohwi
- Pseudostellaria sylvatica (Maxim.) Pax
- Pseudostellaria tianmushanensis G.H.Xia & G.Y.Li
- Pseudostellaria tibetica Ohwi
- Pseudostellaria webbiana (Benth. ex G.Don) Ikonn.
- Pseudostellaria wuyishanensis X.Luo & Q.Y.Yang
- Pseudostellaria zhejiangensis X.F.Jin & B.Y.Ding
