= Providencia sneebia =

Scientific classification
- Domain: Bacteria
- Kingdom: Pseudomonadati
- Phylum: Pseudomonadota
- Class: Gammaproteobacteria
- Order: Enterobacterales
- Family: Morganellaceae
- Genus: Providencia
- Species: P. sneebia

Binomial name
- Providencia sneebia Juneja & Lazzaro, 2009

Species of bacterium

Providencia sneebia is a gram-negative species of bacteria first isolated from the hemolymph of fruit flies. It has also been observed to be symbiotic with marine microalgae. The pathogen has been shown to be fatal to fruit flies without triggering a severe immune response. It has been suggested that P. sneebia is capable of active immune evasion. Thioesterases from P. sneebia have been proposed as industrial enzymes in the production of biofuels.
