= Providencia stuartii =

Scientific classification
- Domain: Bacteria
- Kingdom: Pseudomonadati
- Phylum: Pseudomonadota
- Class: Gammaproteobacteria
- Order: Enterobacterales
- Family: Morganellaceae
- Genus: Providencia
- Species: P. stuartii

Binomial name
- Providencia stuartii Ewing 1962

Species of bacterium

Providencia stuartii (commonly P. stuartii), is a Gram negative bacillus that is commonly found in soil, water, and sewage. P. stuartii is the most common of the 5 species found in the genus Providencia, with Providencia rettgeri, Providencia alcalifaciens, Providencia rustigianii, P. heimbachae. Providencia stuartii can be incubated at 37 °C in nutrient agar or nutrient broth. P. stuartii is the genomic source for the restriction endonuclease, PstI. Some other important information about P. stuartii is that it is motile via flagella, non-sporulating, non-lactose fermenting, catalase positive and oxidase negative. It can also grow in anaerobic conditions and on Simmon’s Citrate Agar.

== Role in diseases ==
Providencia stuartii is the most common Providencia species capable of causing human infections. Providencia stuartii is an opportunistic pathogen seen in patients with severe burns or long-term indwelling urinary catheters. This puts elderly individuals at a greater risk for P. stuartii infections. In animals P. stuartii infections can cause neonatal diarrhea due to P. stuartii infection in dairy cows. In humans, P. stuartii can be isolated from urine (most common), stool, and blood, as well as from sputum, skin, and wound cultures. P. stuartii sepsis is primarily of urinary origin. It is the most common cause of purple urine bag syndrome. Upon physical examination, P stuartii bloodstream infection is associated with fever, tachycardia, and hypotension.

== Biochemical characteristics of Providencia stuartii ==
| Test type | Test | Characteristics |
|---|---|---|
| Colony characters | Size | Small |
| Colony characters | Type | Round |
| Colony characters | Color | Opaque |
| Colony characters | Shape | Convex |
| Morphological characters | Shape | Rod |
| Physiological characters | Motility | + |
| Physiological characters | Growth at 6.5% NaCl | + |
| Biochemical characters | Gram's staining | – |
| Biochemical characters | Oxidase | – |
| Biochemical characters | Catalase | + |
| Biochemical characters | Oxidative-Fermentative | Fermentative |
| Biochemical characters | Motility | + |
| Biochemical characters | Methyl Red | + |
| Biochemical characters | Voges-Proskauer | – |
| Biochemical characters | Indole | + |
| Biochemical characters | H_{2}S Production | – |
| Biochemical characters | Urease | + |
| Biochemical characters | Nitrate reductase | + |
| Biochemical characters | β-Galactosidase | – |
| Hydrolysis of | Gelatin | – |
| Hydrolysis of | Aesculin | – |
| Hydrolysis of | Casein | – |
| Hydrolysis of | Tween 40 | – |
| Hydrolysis of | Tween 60 | – |
| Hydrolysis of | Tween 80 | – |
| Acid production from | Glycerol | + |
| Acid production from | Galactose | – |
| Acid production from | D-Glucose | + |
| Acid production from | D-Fructose | + |
| Acid production from | L-Rhamnose | - |
| Acid production from | Mannitol | - |
| Acid production from | N-Acetylglucosamine | + |
| Acid production from | Amygdalin | + |
| Acid production from | Maltose | - |
| Acid production from | D-Melibiose | - |
| Acid production from | D-Trehalose | - |
| Acid production from | Glycogen | + |
| Acid production from | D-Turanose | + |

Note: + = Positive, – =Negative
