= Realgar/Indigo naturalis =

Medication used to treat acute promyelocytic leukemia

Combination of
- Realgar: Arsenic compound
- Indigo naturalis: Traditional Chinese medicine
- Radix salviae miltiorrhizae: Traditional Chinese medicine
- Radix pseudostellariae: Traditional Chinese medicine

Clinical data
- Other names: Realgar–Indigo naturalis formulation (RIF); Compound Huangdai
- Routes of administration: By mouth
- ATC code: L01XX27 (WHO)

Legal status
- Legal status: US: Not FDA approved; CN: Rx

Realgar/Indigo naturalis (RIF), also known as Compound Huangdai (复方黄黛), is a medication used to treat acute promyelocytic leukemia. Effectiveness appears similar to arsenic trioxide. It is generally used together with all-trans-retinoic acid (ATRA). It is taken by mouth.

Side effects may include abdominal pain and rash. It is made up of a combination of realgar (tetra-arsenic tetra-sulfide), Indigo naturalis, root of Salvia miltiorrhiza, and root of Pseudostellaria heterophylla. It works by breaking down the cancer protein retinoic acid receptor alpha. The main active ingredients according to NCI are tetraarsenic tetrasulfide (realgar), indirubin (from the indigo) and tanshinone IIA (from the Salvia).

Realgar-Indigo naturalis was developed in the 1980s and approved for medical use in China in 2009. It is on the World Health Organization's List of Essential Medicines. It is made in China and was originally formulated as a Chinese patent medicine. It is not approved in either the United States or Europe as of 2019. A year of treatment costs 60,000 Chinese yuan, as of 2017.

== Composition ==
WHO data indicates that the medication is provided in units of 270 mg of the mixture, 30 mg of which is tetraarsenic tetrasulfide (As_{4}S_{4}). The 2004 Chinese patent for this medication indicates that it contains 12-18% realgar (90-95% As_{4}S_{4}), 25-42% Indigo naturalis, 36-46% Salvia miltiorrhiza root (separately water-extracted), and 12-18% Pseudostellaria heterophylla root.

== Pharmacology ==
The basic action of this medication is similar to arsenic trioxide in that the arsenic component triggers degradation of the PML-RARα oncoprotein, by shifting the protein out of the nucleoplasm onto the nuclear matrix. Arsenic also encourages ubiquitination of the oncoprotein, together making it a target for the proteosome. Wang et al. 2008 suggests that the addition of indirubin and tanshinone IIA enhances the action of arsenic by synergy; these components cannot move the protein on their own.

The pharmokinetics are similar to IV arsenic trioxide.

== Society and culture ==
=== History ===
A combination of indigo with realgar, named Qīnghuáng sǎn, is known in old traditional Chinese medicine (TCM) literature. In the 1960s, Zhōu Ǎixiáng of China Academy of Chinese Medical Sciences Xiyuan Hospital tried the combination on leukemia with some results. In the 1980s, Huáng Shìlín of Shenyang Theatre Military Hospital came up with the current formulation, again justifying it only using TCM theory. It is unclear whether Huáng was aware of Zhang Tingdong's work on arsenic trioxide in the 1970s.

In 1995, the medication was approved within the People's Liberation Army health system. It was allowed to start formal clinical trial in 2002, patented in 2004, then approved for the general Chinese market in 2009. It entered the Chinese treatment guide for APL in 2014 as an alternative to injected arsenic. The patent was initially held by Tiankang Pharmaceuticals, an unprofitable spin-off of an electrics company. In 2015, Yifan Biotech acquired all of Tiankang Pharmaceuticals and started heavier promotion of the drug.

=== Ethnopharmacology ===
The medication is approved in China as a Chinese patent medicine. A medication being approved as such means that it would have to conform to some form of TCM theory, and that its indication is commonly written both in modern medicine language and in the folk-medical language of TCM. In the case of RIF, the approved Chinese package insert states the following as indication:

Clears away heat and detoxifies, replenishes qi and produces blood. Used for the initial treatment of acute promyelocytic leukemia.

The four ingredients are also said to conform to a rule called 君臣佐使 "sovereign, minister, aide, and agent", in which each TCM formula consists of a small number of "sovereign drugs" with the three other classes serving as supporting forces. In this case, realgar is considered the "sovereign", Salvia miltiorrhiza the "minister", and the rest the "agents". The synergy reported by Wang et al. (2008) is reported in domestic media as scientific validation of this aspect of TCM theory.
