= Michele Morganella =

Italian footballer

Personal information
- Date of birth: 25 April 1986 (age 40)
- Place of birth: Sierre, Switzerland
- Height: 1.70 m (5 ft 7 in)
- Position: Midfielder

Team information
- Current team: FC Chippis

Youth career
- Sion

Senior career*
Years	Team	Apps	(Gls)
2002–2003	Sion B	7	(0)
2003–2006	FC Chippis		
2006–2007	Chiasso	7	(0)
2006–2012	Sion B	69	(6)
2007–2011	Sion	2	(0)
2009–2010	→ Le Mont (loan)	27	(4)
2010–2011	→ Nyon (loan)	21	(2)
2012	Kriens	12	(1)
2012–2014	Le Mont	40	(0)
2014–2016	FC Azzurri LS 90	12	(1)
2016–2017	Martigny-Sports	8	(0)
2017–2019	Martigny-Sports B		(0)
2019–2024	FC Chippis	3	(2)
- * Club domestic league appearances and goals as of 17 September 2024

Michele Morganella (born 25 April 1986) is an Italian footballer who last played as midfielder in Switzerland for FC Chippis.
