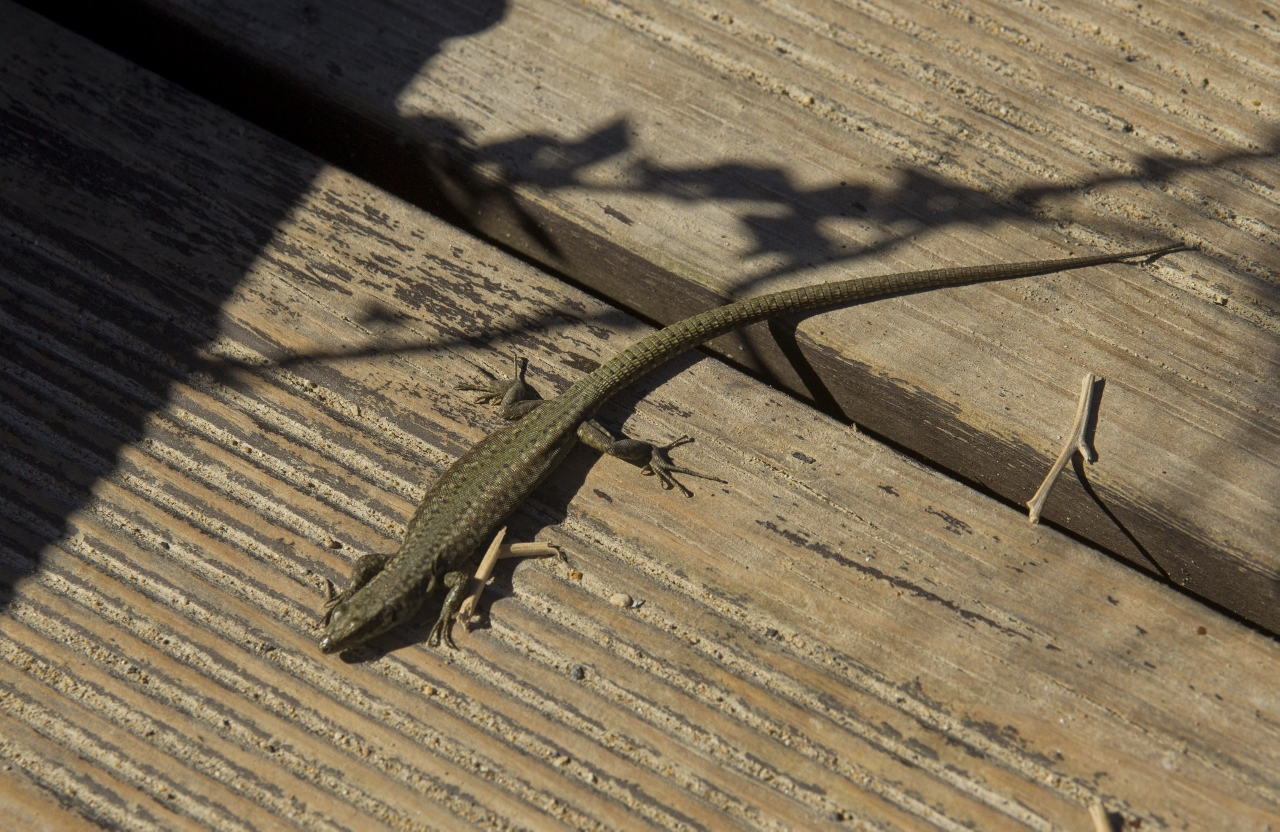

Scientific classification
- Kingdom: Animalia
- Phylum: Chordata
- Class: Reptilia
- Order: Squamata
- Family: Lacertidae
- Genus: Podarcis
- Species: P. virescens

Binomial name
- Podarcis virescens Geniez, Sa-Sousa, Guillaume, Cluchier, & Crochet, 2014

= Podarcis virescens =

Species of lizard

Podarcis virescens, or Geniez's wall lizard, is a lizard of the Lacertidae family. Podarcis virescens is commonly found in the Iberian Peninsula, including Spain and Portugal.

== Description ==
Podarcis virescens is a lizard species of a moderate size, although it can be significantly larger than other lizards in the Podarcis genus, such as Podarcis carbonelli. Podarcis virescens vary significantly in colour, with individuals ranging from white to brown or black. Individuals, particularly males, may change colour to green during the spring, which then disappears in the summer. The underside of the lizard is more yellow than other parts of its body. Podarcis virescens is robust and not flattened compared to other lizard species. Males and females are of around the same size, between 40 mm and 63 mm.

Podarcis virescens is considered a robust lizard due to its build. Podarcis lizards vary greatly in colour and build, so Podarcis virescens does not completely share appearance traits with other species of the same genus. This was likely caused by increased diversification in the history of Podarcis lizards, especially during the time period preceding and around the Zanclean flood.

== Body temperature ==
Podarcis virescens has been used in studies on lizard body temperatures and to determine accurate methods of reading lizard body temperatures using non-invasive techniques. Overall, Podarcis virescens was found to have a lower body temperature than two other lizard species which were Lacerta schreiberi and Timon lepidus. This may be due to the smaller size of the Podarcis virescens lizard compared to the other two species. Since Podarcis virescens is smaller than the other lizards studied, they also vary more in temperature when switching between heating and cooling conditions. Due to the availability of the Podarcis virescens lizard, it is possible to use them for similar studies.

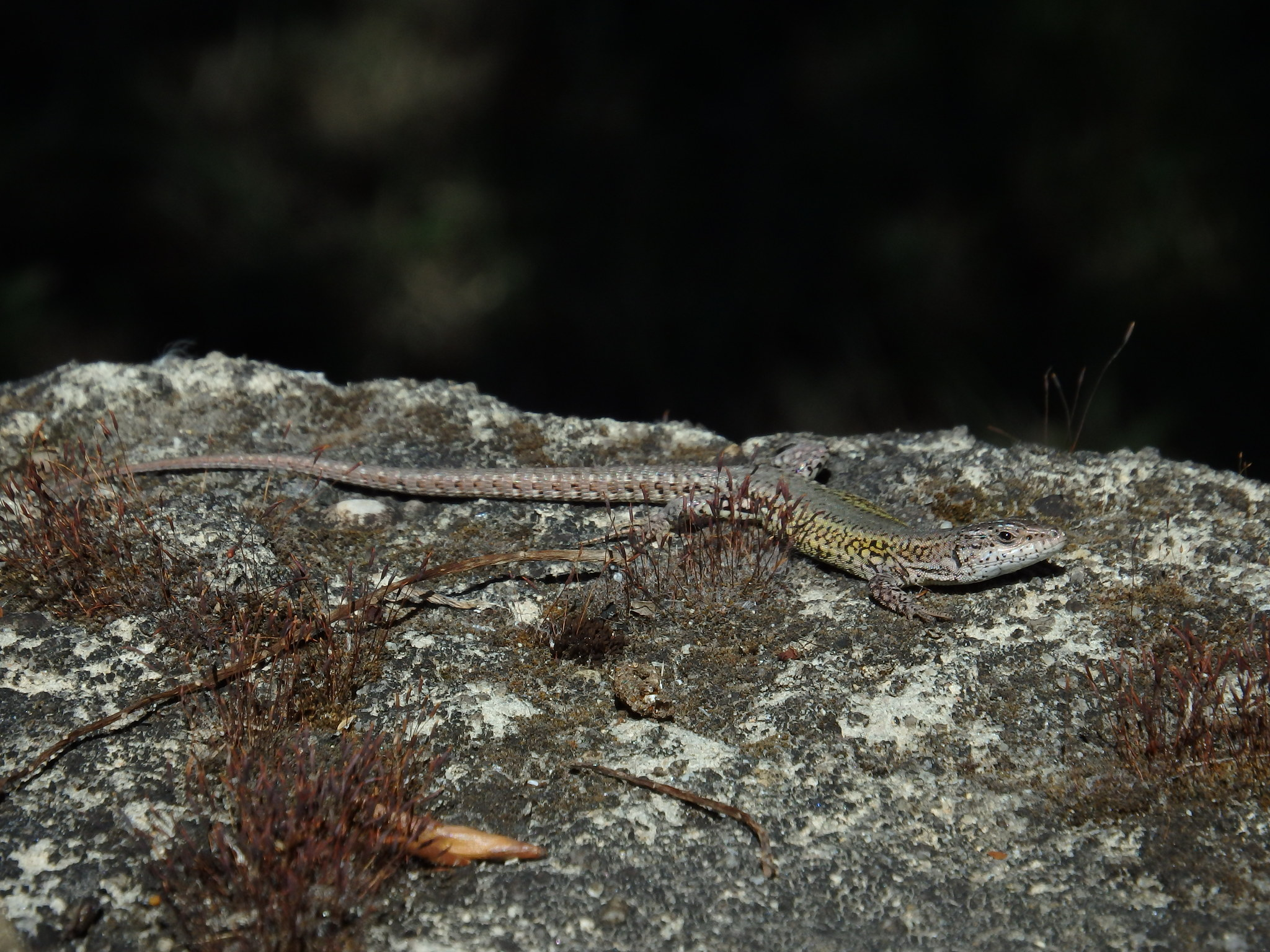
Podarcis virescens

== History and taxonomy ==
Around 20 Mya, Podarcis lizards, also known as wall lizards, began to arise in the Mediterranean region. From 20 Mya to 11 Mya, Podarcis lizards likely expanded to the Iberian Peninsula and other parts of Europe. Approximately 5.3 Mya, the Zanclean Flood ended the Messinan salinity crisis, which led to increased diversification in lizard species, including Podarcis lizards. These genetic changes formed the Podarcis lizard species found today, one of which is Podarcis virescens. Due to the immense diversification during this time, an accurate family tree for Podarcis lizards has been difficult to construct. The exact taxonomy of Podarcis virescens is still being investigated as of 2020.

Podarcis virescens was accepted as a species by the Taxonomic Committee of the Societas Europaea Herpetologica in 2020 after a series of studies on the Podarcis genus of lizards. Previously, Podarcis hispanicus included similar Podarcis lizards, including Podarcis virescens and Podarcis guadarramae. After genetic and morphological studies, it was found that there were enough molecular and morphological differences to establish Podarcis virescens as its own species. These species are fairly similar as they all inhabit slightly different regions of the Iberian Peninsula and share other traits such as their appearance and behavior. Podarcis virescens is partially distinguished by more heavily inhabiting central and southwestern parts of the Iberian Peninsula compared to other Podarcis lizards.

=== Introgression and speciation ===
Podarcis virescens is closely related to other lizard species, especially other lizards in the Podarcis genus. Opportunities for interaction between Podarcis virescens and other Podarcis lizards are possible due to significant overlap in habitat and inhabited regions. Additionally, Podarcis virescens has been seen interacting with other Podarcis lizards such as Podarcis carbonelli lizards. Podarcis virescens has definitively been found to be a separate species than other Podarcis lizards, including Podarcis carbonelli, with a divergence time of 3.9 Mya. However, there is some introgression between the species as well. This is seen through the genomes of the two species, which are significantly related.

=== Related species ===
Podarcis virescens is a lizard species in the Podarcis genus, which includes many lizard species found in the Mediterranean region. Podarcis lizards are commonly known as wall lizards. Two of the closest relatives of Podarcis virescens are Podarcis hispanicus and Podarcis carbonelli, both of which are also native to the Iberian Peninsula. Podarcis carbonelli are more commonly found near rivers and are somewhat smaller in size than Podarcis virescens. These Podarcis species share common diets and other traits. There has been a cited case of Podarcis virescens preying on Podarcis carbonelli, although it is unknown how common this practice is.

Podarcis visrecen is closely related with Podarcis hispanicus as they co-habituate the Iberian Peninsula. They share similar coloration patterns.

== Habitat and distribution ==
Podarcis virescens is commonly found in the Iberian Peninsula, including Spain and Portugal, most commonly in the Central and Southern regions of the Iberian Peninsula. However, the lizard is not commonly found in the most southern and eastern portions of Spain. Podarcis virescens can be found near cities and villages including Santa Maria da Feira, in Portugal, and Villanueva de los Escuderos, in Spain. The lizard can sometimes be found near rivers or mountains, although the lizard's habitat can vary greatly and includes human-inhabited areas around cities. Examples of Podarcis virescens sightings include cultivated plains and human roads surrounding Spanish and Portuguese cities.

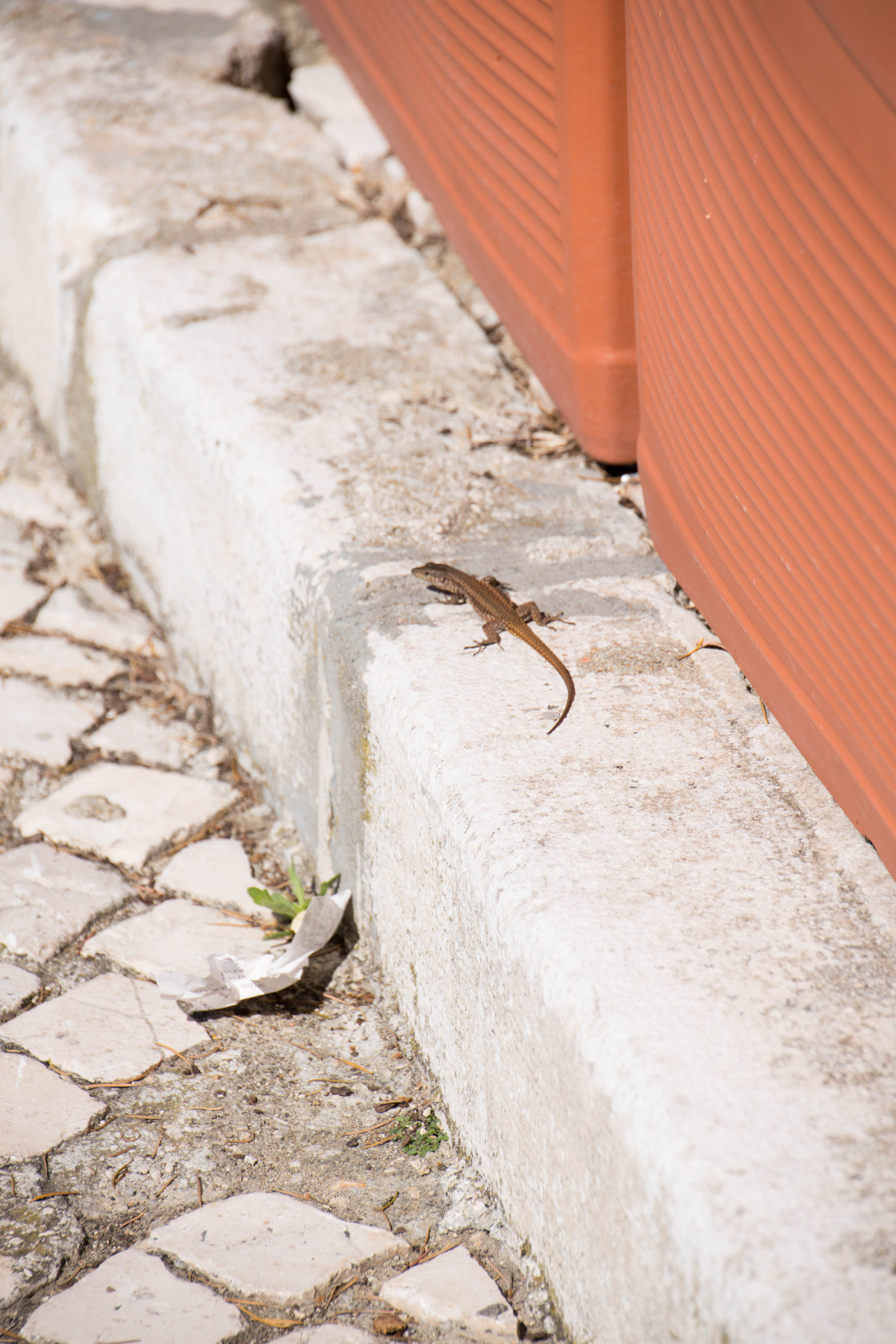
Podarcis virescens

=== Urban habitats ===
As the native habitat of Podarcis virescens in the Iberian Peninsula has become more urbanized by humans, they have adapted to the urban environment and inhabit areas where humans are present such as human gardens. In addition to living on natural ground and rocky areas, Podarcis virescens lizards have adapted to live on artificial structures such as roads, bridges, and buildings. However, when introduced into a new area such as a garden, they are not very likely to spread out far from the location at which they were introduced. This means that the spread of the Podarcis virescens lizard to adapt to new locations may be slow.

== Ecology and behavior ==
=== Diet ===
Like most similar lizards, Podarcis virescens mainly rely on small arthropods for food. This includes Coleoptera, Homoptera, and Araneae arthropods. In some cases, cannibalism or preying on similar lizards has been found and documented in similar lizards. Several cases of cannibalism with other Podarcis lizards, like Podarcis atrata, eating eggs and juveniles has been observed. One case of Podarcis virescens preying on Podarcis carbonelli has been observed in Portugal. These cases are predicted to involve high density areas of lizards with low resources resulting in cannibalism. With the Podarcis virescens case, it is possible that the Podarcis virescens was significantly larger than the Podarcis carbonelli lizard as Podarcis virescens lizards are generally larger in size.

=== Interaction with other lizards ===
==== Predation ====
Podarcis virescens is related to similar Podarcis lizards which are also found in the Iberian Peninsula. Due to overlapping habitats, interactions can occur between the species. One case is with Podarcis virescens lizards and Podarcis carbonelli lizards. Both are found in the Iberian Peninsula, with significant overlap particularly in parts of Portugal. Here, with other Podarcis lizard species, larger lizards have been found to prey on similar smaller lizard species. This is due to overlap in the desired resources of the species and competition when resources are scarce or population density is high. In the case of Podarcis virescens and Podarcis carbonelli lizards, one Podarcis virescens lizard was observed to prey on a smaller Podarcis carbonelli lizard.

==== Displacement by invasive species ====
Podarcis virescens is native to the Iberian Peninsula. However, other Podarcis lizards have been found to be invasive species in the native areas of Podarcis virescens. This includes the Podarcis siculus lizard from Italy which was introduced to Portugal, where Podarcis virescens are native, around the year 2000. This has resulted in some displacement of Podarcis virescens lizards from their native habitats. However, the exact method of competition between the two Podarcis lizard species was unknown in nature. It is possible that direct interference competition occurs between the Podarcis virescens and Podarcis siculus lizards where aggression and other behaviors play a role. It is also possible that indirect competition for similar resources occurs.

==== Competition with Podarcis siculus ====
Since the displacement of Podarcis virescens lizards in their natural region of the Iberian Peninsula is occurring due to invasion by other Podarcis lizards like Podarcis siculus, studies have been conducted to investigate the behavioral interactions between the two lizard species and how they compete. It was found in controlled experiments that Podarcis siculus lizards outcompete Podarcis virescens counterparts through indirect competition methods rather than direct interference methods. Podarcis siculus lizards were found to arrive at food stations earlier, consume more food, and gain more weight than Podarcis virescens lizards which may explain why Podarcis virescens are being displaced in nature. Evidence was not found to support the direct method of competition, such as aggression between the two lizard species.

== Comparison to Podarcis siculus ==
Podarcis virescens lizards are often seen basking at a 64% rate, which is slightly higher than that of the related Podarcis siculus lizard species, which basks at a rate of 57%. Podarcis virescens lizards can also be seen being active at a 20% rate, while the Podarcis siculus lizard species is active at an 18% rate. Both Podarcis virescens and Podarcis siculus lizards may seek shelter when disturbed, with only around 22% of each lizard species not seeking any shelter. Overall, the two lizard species behave similarly, possibly due to their relatedness and shared habitat. This also may increase competition between the two species. The native P. virescens has seemed to better adapt to the urban habitats within the city, however, compared to the invasive P. siculus, which tends to stay in a smaller, more natural environment.

=== Exploration ===
The behavior of Podarcis virescens lizards is of interest to researchers due to the possible differences between Podarcis virescens behavior and Podarcis siculus, an invading species in the Iberian Peninsula, behavior. In a controlled study, it was found that Podarcis virescens lizards were less willing to explore a new environment than Podarcis siculus lizards. Podarcis virescens lizards were also less willing to approach new objects and explore after being scared than Podarcis siculus lizards. These results indicate that Podarcis virescens may be outcompeted by invading Podarcis siculus lizards because of behavioral traits that make Podarcis virescens less suitable for competing with the invading species.

== Parasites ==
Podarcis virescens lizards face parasites in their native habitats in the Iberian Peninsula. A study on their parasites genetically identified most Podarcis virescens parasites as haemogregarines, in the genus Karyolysus, which are common blood parasites in many reptiles. These parasites also affect other Podarcis lizard species in the Iberian Peninsula, like Podarcis hispanicus and Podarcis bocagei. This is likely due to overlapping traits such as habitat and diet which may expose Podarcis lizard species to the same parasites. Podarcis virescens lizards also have a high prevalence of infection by parasites at 69.0%, which indicates that the parasites have significant impacts on the lizard species.

=== Parasite comparison with Podarcis siculus ===
As Podarcis siculus lizards have been invading the native Iberian Peninsula habitat of Podarcis virescens lizards, one possible difference between the two lizard species has been their interactions with parasites. A study found that while Podarcis virescens lizards have high rates of infection, 69.0%, the invading Podarcis siculus lizards are only infected at a 3.7% rate. Furthermore, infected Podarcis virescens lizards are affected more significantly than infected Podarcis siculus lizards. This difference in susceptibility to parasitic infection, where Podarcis virescens lizards are at a disadvantage, may be one factor contributing to the successful invasion of the Iberian Peninsula by Podarcis siculus lizards.

== Conservation status ==
Podarcis virescens currently does not have a conservation status, according to the International Union for the Conservation of Nature (IUCN). While the IUCN lists other lizard species, including lizards in the Podarcis genus, as being endangered or monitored for conservation, there does not appear to be concern for Podarcis virescens levels. They are commonly found throughout the Iberian Peninsula in mountainous and other areas. They have adapted to human changes in their habitat and can be seen on human structures like roads and buildings. The exact impact of humans on Podarcis virescens is unknown, as no studies have been conducted to investigate levels of Podarcis virescens in their native region.

== Interactions with humans ==
As Podarcis virescens lizards are native to the Iberian Peninsula, which is changing due to the presence of humans, lizards have adapted to adjust to the significant human presence in their natural regions. Podarcis virescens lizards are often seen on human structures such as buildings and roads. Podarcis virescens is even seen in human establishments, like in the walls of man-made structures and castles. When introduced to a new environment such as a city, Podarcis virescens lizards are comfortable adjusting to such a location and exploring their nearby surroundings. However, they do not venture far from their initial location of introduction, and have not been observed to interact with humans significantly.

This response to humans is similar to that of other Podarcis lizards, including Podarcis muralis, which have also become accustomed to humans being in their environments and natural habitats. Humans no longer represent a significant threat as predators to these lizards, so they have become more comfortable in the presence of humans. Urbanization has changed their natural habitats, but these lizards are adjusting to their new environments.
