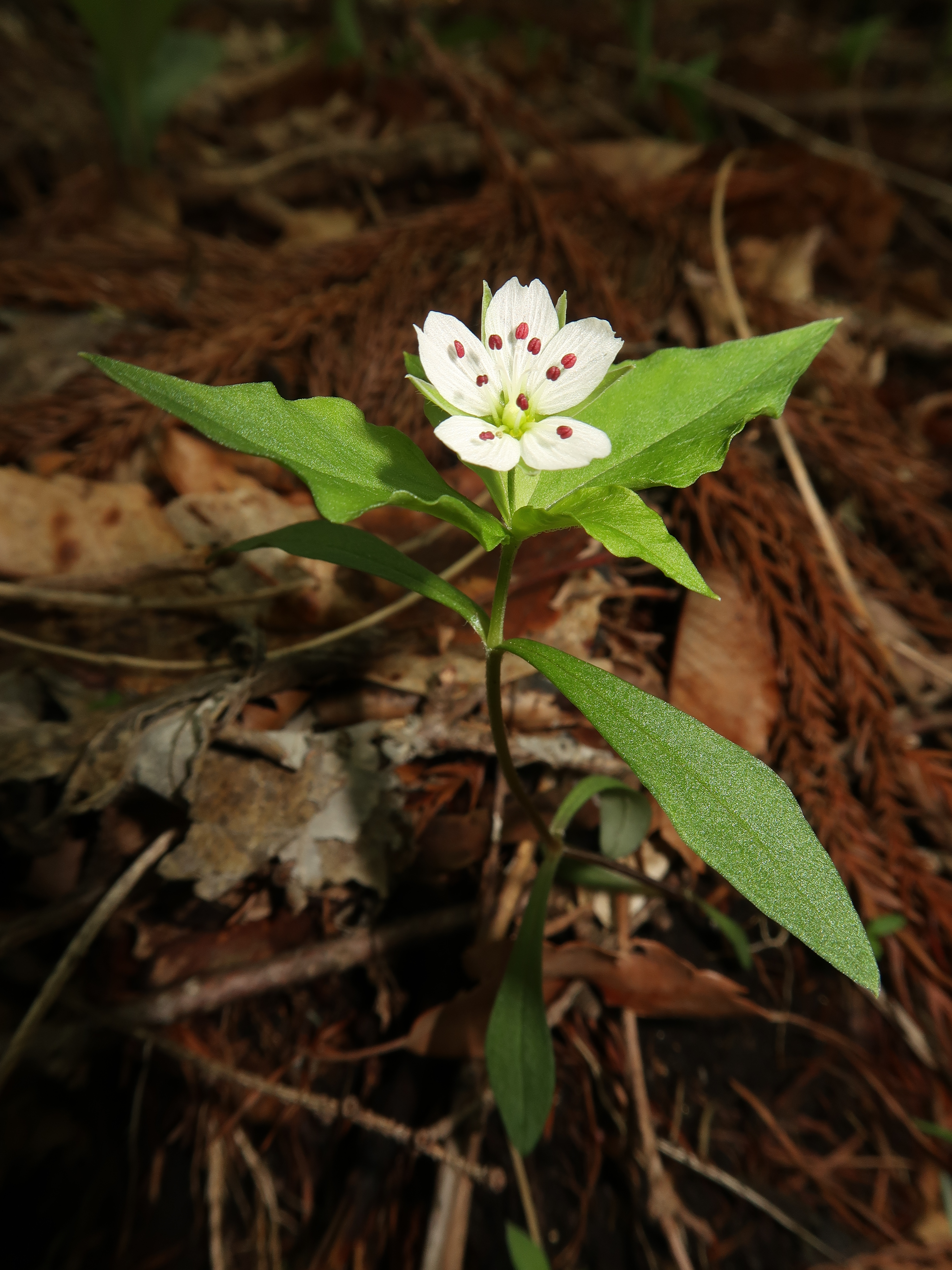

Scientific classification
- Kingdom: Plantae
- Clade: Tracheophytes
- Clade: Angiosperms
- Clade: Eudicots
- Order: Caryophyllales
- Family: Caryophyllaceae
- Genus: Pseudostellaria
- Species: P. heterophylla

Binomial name
- Pseudostellaria heterophylla Rupr. & Maxim.

= Pseudostellaria heterophylla =

Species of flowering plant

Pseudostellaria heterophylla, known commonly as hai er shen (Chinese: 孩兒參, kid ginseng, child ginseng), tai zi shen (Chinese: 太子參, crown prince ginseng), and false starwort, is a eudicot species in the family Caryophyllaceae. It is used in Chinese medicine and herbalism and is proclaimed to tonify the qi and generate yin fluids. It has been labeled as an adaptogen. It is known as the "ginseng of the lungs". The plant is a low growing plant of the pink family that is grown in Southern China in the provinces of Jiangsu, Anhui, Shandong, Heilongjiang, Jilin, Liaoning, Hebei, Henan, Shaanxi, Zhejiang, Jiangxi, Hubei, and Shanxi.

== Ethnobotany ==
Haiershen is a relatively recent addition to the Chung Yao Chi New Chinese Materia Medica (Chinese: 中藥劑大辭典), having been officially added in 1959, based upon local and ethnic use. It is weaker than Panax ginseng. The herb is a mild adaptogen, demulcent, an immune tonic, nutritive, and a pectoral herb. In Chinese terms it tonifies the yin. Accordingly, the herb is restorative for lung damage due to excess heat or dryness including hot or dry asthma, pleurisy, bronchitis, bacterial pneumonia, wheezing, dry cough, and emphysema. Scientific research shows that this Pseudostellaria aids in protecting the mucin layer that lines the respiratory tract and functions as an immune defense system. In the form Li Gan Zi Shen Tang (Chinese: 理肝滋腎湯, "Regulate the Liver & Enrich the Kidneys Decoction") it is used to treat yin deficiency associated with diabetes mellitus. The polysaccharide fractions have in vitro anti-tumor properties. A lectin in the roots is being studied for anti HIV purposes.

This is a perennial herb with tuber and solitary erect stems up to 20 centimeters tall.

The flower has 5 white petals, but some flowers are cleistogamous and lack petals.

== See also ==
- Adaptogen
- Herbalism
- Chinese Medicine
