= Indirubin =

Names
- IUPAC name (3Z)-3-(3-Oxo-1,3-dihydro-2H-indol-2-ylidene)-1,3-dihydro-2H-indol-2-one
- Other names Indigo red

Identifiers
CAS Number	906748-38-7; 479-41-4 (non-specific)
3D model (JSmol)	Interactive image
ChEBI	CHEBI:92322
ChEMBL	ChEMBL1276127; ChEMBL3185783
ChemSpider	4477010
DrugBank	DB12379
ECHA InfoCard	100.119.646
EC Number	610-392-0
PubChem CID	10177
UNII	V86L8P74GI
- InChI: InChI=1S/C16H10N2O2/c19-15-10-6-2-4-8-12(10)17-14(15)13-9-5-1-3-7-11(9)18-16(13)20/h1-8,17H,(H,18,20)/b14-13- Key: CRDNMYFJWFXOCH-YPKPFQOOSA-N
- SMILES: c1ccc2c(c1)/C(=C/3\C(=O)c4ccccc4N3)/C(=O)N2

Properties
Chemical formula	C_{16}H_{10}N_{2}O_{2}
Molar mass	262.268 g·mol^{−1}

Hazards
- GHS labelling
Pictograms	(GHS07: Exclamation mark)
Signal word	Warning
Hazard statements	H315, H319, H335
Precautionary statements	P261, P264, P271, P280, P302+P352, P304+P340, P305+P351+P338, P312, P321, P332+P313, P337+P313, P362, P403+P233, P405, P501
- Except where otherwise noted, data are given for materials in their standard state (at 25 °C [77 °F], 100 kPa). Infobox references

Indirubin is a chemical compound most often produced as a byproduct of bacterial metabolism. For instance, it is one of the compounds responsible for the generally benign condition purple urine bag syndrome, resulting from bacteria metabolizing indoxyl sulfate found naturally in urine.

Indirubin is a structural isomer (more precisely is position isomer) of indigo dye.

== Indigo naturalis ==
Indirubin is a chemical constituent of indigo naturalis (also known as qing dai 青黛), which has been used since 627 AD in traditional Chinese medicine. It is essentially the indigo dye as traditionally extracted from plants by fermentation and lime treatment. The dye mixture contains a variety of organic compounds, indirubin and tryptanthrin being possible sources of some pharmacological actions. It is used in realgar/Indigo naturalis, a medication for acute promyelocytic leukemia.

== Research ==
Indirubin exerts its effects on the human body by downregulating expression of genes. Genes PLK1 and PIN1, both oncogenic, have been shown to be affected by indirubin. Indirubin has, in vitro and in vivo, been shown to reduce expression of the CDC25B gene, which codes for production of CDC25B enzyme. CDC stands for cell-division-cycle, and is used in cellular reproduction. Studies suggest that mouse cells are viable after the CDC25B (and CDC25C) genes are "knocked out", but removal of CDC25A results in non-viable cells.

Indirubin has not been shown to prevent or treat cancer in humans. However, it is being studied for treatment of small-cell lung cancer, glioblastoma, and chronic myeloid leukemia, either alone or in conjunction with more typical cancer management treatments. It has also been studied for potential use in the treatment of ulcerative colitis, an immune-modulated disease process.

Indirubin shows anti-inflammatory and anti-angiogenesis properties in vitro.

== See also ==
- Realgar/Indigo naturalis
