= Nutrient agar =

Medium for growing microorganisms

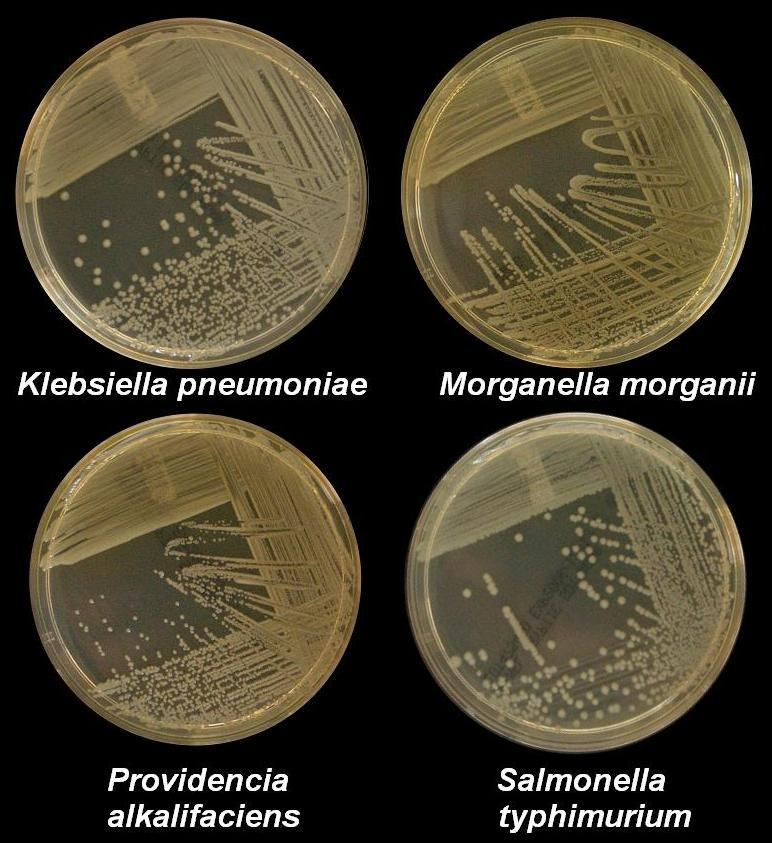
Streak plates of several bacterial species on nutrient agar plates

Nutrient agar is a general-purpose solid medium supporting growth of a wide range of non-fastidious organisms. It typically contains (mass/volume):

- 0.5% peptone – this provides organic nitrogen
- 0.3% beef extract/yeast extract – the water-soluble content of these contribute vitamins, carbohydrates, nitrogen, and salts
- 1.5% agar – this gives the mixture solidity
- 0.5% sodium chloride – this gives the mixture proportions similar to those found in the cytoplasm of most organisms
- distilled water – water serves as a transport medium for the agar's various substances
- pH adjusted to neutral (6.8) at 25 °C (77 °F).

Nutrient broth has the same composition, but lacks agar.

These ingredients are combined and boiled for approximately one minute to ensure they are mixed and then sterilized by autoclaving, typically at 121 °C (250 °F) for 15 minutes. Then they are cooled to around 50 °C (122 °F) and poured into Petri dishes which are covered immediately. Once the dishes hold solidified agar, they are stored upside down and are often refrigerated until used. Inoculation takes place on warm dishes rather than cool ones: if refrigerated for storage, the dishes must be rewarmed to room temperature prior to inoculation.

== See also ==
- Plate count agar
- Bacteria
- Bacterial growth
