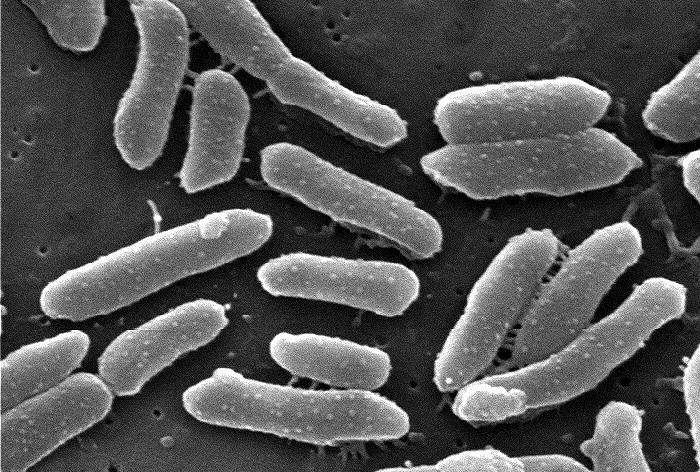
- Providencia alcalifaciens

Scientific classification
- Domain: Bacteria
- Kingdom: Pseudomonadati
- Phylum: Pseudomonadota
- Class: Gammaproteobacteria
- Order: Enterobacterales
- Family: Morganellaceae
- Genus: Providencia; Ewing 1962

Species
- P. stuartii P. sneebia P. rettgeri P. rustigianii P. heimbachae P. burhodogranariea P. alcalifaciens

= Providencia (bacterium) =

Genus of bacteria

Providencia is genus of Gram-negative, motile bacteria of the family Morganellaceae. It was named after Providence, Rhode Island, where C. A. Stuart and colleagues studied these bacteria at Brown University.

== Providencia pathogens of humans ==
Some species are opportunistic pathogens in humans. Providencia stuartii can cause urinary tract infections, particularly in patients with long-term indwelling urinary catheters or extensive severe burns. Alternatively, Providencia rettgeri is a common cause of traveller's diarrhoea.

== Providencia pathogens in insects ==
Many strains have been isolated from the haemolymph of Drosophila melanogaster fruit flies. These strains display different levels of virulence. For example Providencia sneebia is highly virulent, and infection always results in fly mortality. Alternatively, P. rettgeri displays an intermediate virulence wherein some individuals survive infection, while others perish. The susceptibility to P. rettgeri is strongly tied to an allele of the antimicrobial peptide gene Diptericin. Surprisingly, the fly's defence against P. rettgeri seems to rely almost exclusively on Diptericin, as deletion of Diptericin leads to complete mortality. Meanwhile deletion of multiple other antimicrobial peptides has no effect on P. rettgeri virulence. Yet defence against P. burhodogranariea is determined by multiple antimicrobial peptides beyond just Diptericin. Why Diptericin is so specifically important in defence against one species of Providencia is not clear, but could yield insight into how bacterial species evolve resistance or susceptibility to antimicrobial compounds.

== Trivia ==
- Providencia burhodogranariea is named after the "big red barn" in which conversations were held around its discovery.
- Some strains are sensitive to ampicillin.
