= Providencia rettgeri =

Scientific classification
- Domain: Bacteria
- Kingdom: Pseudomonadati
- Phylum: Pseudomonadota
- Class: Gammaproteobacteria
- Order: Enterobacterales
- Family: Morganellaceae
- Genus: Providencia
- Species: P. rettgeri

Binomial name
- Providencia rettgeri Rettger 1904

Species of bacterium

Providencia rettgeri (commonly P. rettgeri), is a Gram negative bacterium that is commonly found in both water and land environments. P. rettgeri is in the genus Providencia, along with Providencia stuartii, Providencia alcalifaciens, and Providencia rustigianii. P. rettgeri can be incubated at 37 °C in nutrient agar or nutrient broth. It was first discovered in 1904 after a waterfowl epidemic. Strains of the species have also been isolated from nematodes of the genus Heterorhabditis. Providencia rettgeri also found in marine environment.

== Biochemical characteristics of Providencia rettgeri ==
S.I. Paul et al. (2021) isolated, characterized and identified salt tolerant Providencia rettgeri from marine sponge (Niphates erecta) of the Saint Martin's Island Area of the Bay of Bengal, Bangladesh. Colony, morphological, physiological, and biochemical characteristics of Providencia rettgeri are shown in the Table below.

| Test type | Test | Characteristics |
|---|---|---|
| Colony characters | Size | Small |
| Colony characters | Type | Round |
| Colony characters | Color | Opaque |
| Colony characters | Shape | Convex |
| Morphological characters | Shape | Rod |
| Physiological characters | Motility | + |
| Physiological characters | Growth at 6.5% NaCl | + |
| Biochemical characters | Gram's staining | – |
| Biochemical characters | Oxidase | – |
| Biochemical characters | Catalase | + |
| Biochemical characters | Oxidative-Fermentative | Fermentative |
| Biochemical characters | Motility | + |
| Biochemical characters | Methyl Red | + |
| Biochemical characters | Voges-Proskauer | – |
| Biochemical characters | Indole | + |
| Biochemical characters | H_{2}S Production | – |
| Biochemical characters | Urease | + |
| Biochemical characters | Nitrate reductase | + |
| Biochemical characters | β-Galactosidase | – |
| Hydrolysis of | Gelatin | – |
| Hydrolysis of | Aesculin | – |
| Hydrolysis of | Casein | – |
| Hydrolysis of | Tween 40 | – |
| Hydrolysis of | Tween 60 | – |
| Hydrolysis of | Tween 80 | – |
| Acid production from | Glycerol | + |
| Acid production from | Galactose | – |
| Acid production from | D-Glucose | + |
| Acid production from | D-Fructose | + |
| Acid production from | D-Mannose | + |
| Acid production from | Mannitol | + |
| Acid production from | N-Acetylglucosamine | + |
| Acid production from | Amygdalin | + |
| Acid production from | Maltose | + |
| Acid production from | D-Melibiose | + |
| Acid production from | D-Trehalose | + |
| Acid production from | Glycogen | + |
| Acid production from | D-Turanose | + |

Note: + = Positive, – =Negative

== Identification ==
P. rettgeri can be identified by its motility and its ability to produce acid from mannitol. It does not produce gas from glucose and does not ferment lactose. It also does not produce hydrogen sulfide or acid from xylose.

== Pathogenicity ==
Providencia rettgeri can cause a number of opportunistic infections in humans and can be found in the human gut. It is a major cause of traveller's diarrhea. Strains of P. rettgeri have also been found to cause urinary tract infections and eye infections.

== Research in insects ==
Providencia rettgeri is a natural pathogen of Drosophila fruit flies. Susceptibility to P. rettgeri is strongly tied to an allele of the antimicrobial peptide gene Diptericin. The fly's defence against P. rettgeri seems to rely almost exclusively on Diptericin, as deletion of Diptericin leads to complete mortality. Meanwhile, deletion of multiple other antimicrobial peptides has no effect on P. rettgeri virulence. Yet defence against the related Providencia burhodogranariea is determined by multiple antimicrobial peptides beyond just Diptericin.
