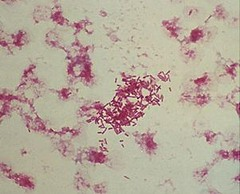

Scientific classification
- Domain: Bacteria
- Kingdom: Pseudomonadati
- Phylum: Pseudomonadota
- Class: Gammaproteobacteria
- Order: Enterobacterales
- Family: Morganellaceae
- Genus: Morganella; Fulton, 1943
- Species: M. morganii

Binomial name
- Morganella morganii Winslow et al., 1919; Fulton, 1943; Brenner et al., 1978

Subspecies
- M. m. morganii M. m. sibonii

Synonyms
- Proteus morganii Winslow et al., 1919 Yale, 1939

= Morganella morganii =

Species of bacterium

Morganella morganii is a species of Gram-negative bacteria. It has a commensal relationship within the intestinal tracts of humans, mammals, and reptiles as normal flora. Although M. morganii has a wide distribution, it is considered an uncommon cause of community-acquired infection, and it is most often encountered in postoperative and other nosocomial infections, such as urinary tract infections.

== Historical identification and systematics ==
Morganella morganii was first described by a British bacteriologist H. de R. Morgan in 1906 as Morgan's bacillus. Morgan isolated the bacterium from stools of infants who were noted to have had "summer diarrhea". Later in 1919, Winslow et al. named Morgan's bacillus, Bacillus morganii. In 1936, though, Rauss renamed B. morganii as Proteus morganii. Fulton, in 1943, showed that B. columbensis and P. morganii were the same and defined the genus Morganella, due to the DNA–DNA hybridization. In 1943, Fulton attempted to define a subspecies, M. m. columbensis. However, in 1962, a review article by Ewing reported that M. columbensis had been re-identified as Escherichia coli, thereby removing that organism from the genus Morganella.

== Microbiology ==
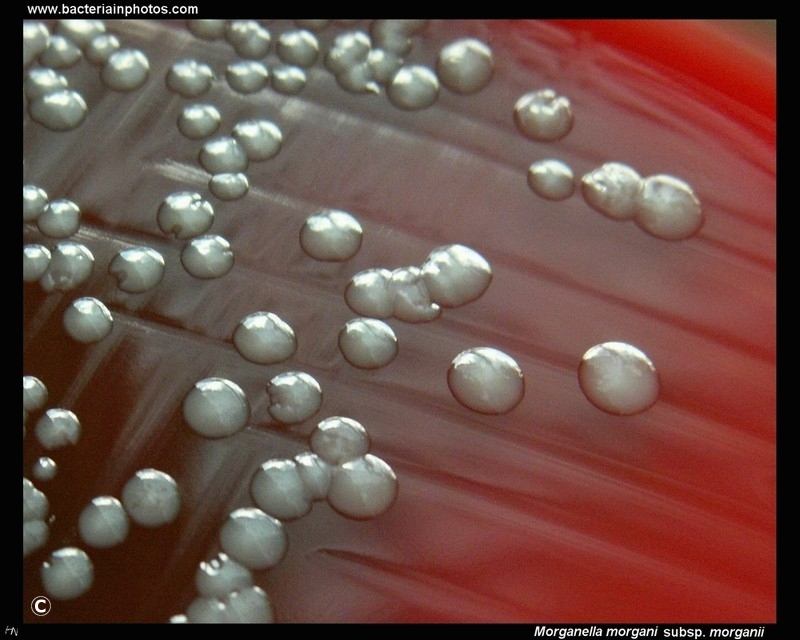
M. morganii grown on blood agar

Morganella morganii is facultatively anaerobic and oxidase-negative. Its colonies appear off-white and opaque in color, when grown on agar plates. M. morganii cells are straight rods, about 0.6–0.7 μm in diameter and 1.0–1.7 μm in length. This organism moves by way of peritrichous flagella, but some strains do not form flagella at 30 °C (86 °F).

M. morganii is split into two subspecies: M. morganii subsp. morganii and M. morganii subsp. sibonii. M. morganii subsp. sibonii is able to ferment trehalose, whereas subsp. morganii cannot, and this is the primary phenotype used to differentiate them.

M. morganii can produce the enzyme catalase, so it is able to convert hydrogen peroxide to water and oxygen. This is a common enzyme found in most living organisms. In addition, it is indole test-positive, meaning that this organism can split tryptophan to indole, pyruvate, and ammonia. M. morganii also produces urease, allowing it to break down urea. Methyl red tests positive in M. morganii, an indicator dye that turns red due to the bacterium's acid production during fermentation. Similar bacteria from the closely related Proteus and Providencia genera, M. morganii is able to deaminate tryptophan through the production of tryptophan deaminase (TDA).

== Role of bacteria ==
Although a rare human pathogen, M. morganii has been reported as a cause of urinary tract infections, nosocomial surgical wound infections, peritonitis, central nervous system infection, endophthalmitis, pneumonia, chorioamnionitis, neonatal sepsis, pyomyositis, necrotizing fasciitis, and arthritis. Numerous cases of nosocomial infection have been described, usually as postsurgical wound infections or urinary tract infections. Patients in whom bacteremia develops are typically immunocompromised, diabetic, or elderly, or have at least one serious underlying disease. M. morganii has been regarded as a normally harmless opportunistic pathogen, but some strains carry "antibiotic-resistant plasmids" and have been associated with nosocomial outbreaks of infections. Several reports indicate M. morganii causes sepsis, ecthyma, endophthalmitis, and chorioamnionitis, and more commonly urinary tract infections, soft tissue infections, septic arthritis, meningitis, and bacteremia, in the latter two cases with frequent fatal consequences.

In a rare case published in 2003, a patient presented with bilateral necrosis of both upper and lower eyelids. Upon microbial analysis, the areas were shown to have heavy growth of M. morganii.

Patients with inflammatory bowel disease, a condition associated with the development of colorectal cancer, often harbor commensal M. morganii. These bacteria may contribute to intestinal tumorigenesis by producing a family of genotoxic metabolites, termed indolimines, that can elicit DNA damage.

== Treatment and antibiotic resistance ==
Treatment of M. morganii infections may include:

- Ticarcillin
- Piperacillin
- Ciprofloxacin
- Third-generation and fourth-generation cephalosporins

A study conducted at the University Hospital at Heraklion, Crete, Greece, showed a 92% success rate in the use of these antibiotics.

However, some M. morganii strains are resistant to penicillin, ampicillin/sulbactam, oxacillin, first-generation and second-generation cephalosporins, macrolides, lincosamides, fosfomycin, colistin, and polymyxin B. The emergence of highly resistant strains of M. morganii have been associated with use of third-generation cephalosporins.

Polymicrobial infections are most abundantly caused by this microbe which additionally damages the skin, soft tissues, and urogenital tract; these can be cured through use of the aforementioned antibiotics.
