= Matija Gogala =

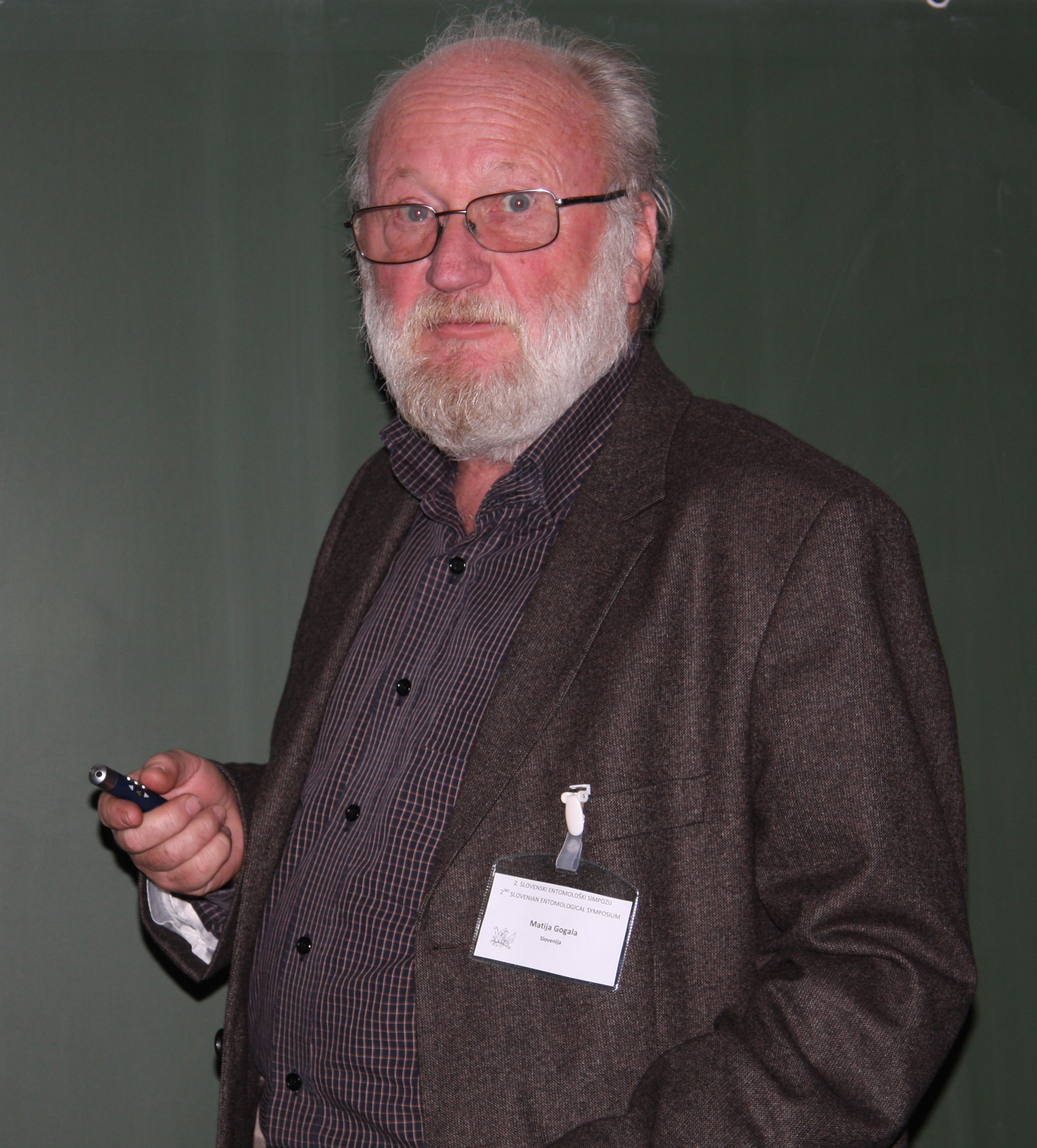
- Matija Gogala lecturing at the 2nd Slovene Entomological Symposium (Ljubljana, 2009)
- Born: December 11, 1937 (age 88); Ljubljana, Slovenia
- Education: University of Ljubljana
- Scientific career
- Fields: Bioacoustics, entomology, animal physiology

Matija Gogala (born December 11, 1937) is a Slovene entomologist, working mainly in the fields of insect bioacoustics, physiology, and taxonomy.

He studied biology at the University of Ljubljana where he graduated in 1960 and became an assistant at the Department of biology (Biotechnical faculty). He received his doctorate in 1964. Later, he became a docent at the department and began teaching animal physiology. He obtained full professorship in 1981.

In the meantime, he worked at the National Institute of Biology in Ljubljana, where he served as a director between 1976 and 1979. In 1987, he began working at Slovenian Museum of Natural History and served also as its director between 1992 and 2001. In 1991, he became an associate, and in 1999 a full member of the Slovenian Academy of Sciences and Arts, currently serving as its vice president. Gogala is also a member of several international scientific committees and boards and the president of the Global Biodiversity Information Facility board for Slovenia.

His son, Andrej Gogala, is also an entomologist.

== Scientific work ==
Gogala's work focuses mainly on physiology and behaviour of different insect groups. At the University of Ljubljana, he researched seasonal pigmentation and physiology of insect sensory organs.

After that, he began working on vibrational communication of bugs, contributing pioneering work in the field of biotremology. His current work focuses on sound production in cicadas and its use in the group's taxonomy.
