= Seismic communication =

Conveying information through mechanical (seismic) vibrations of the substrate

Vibrational communication

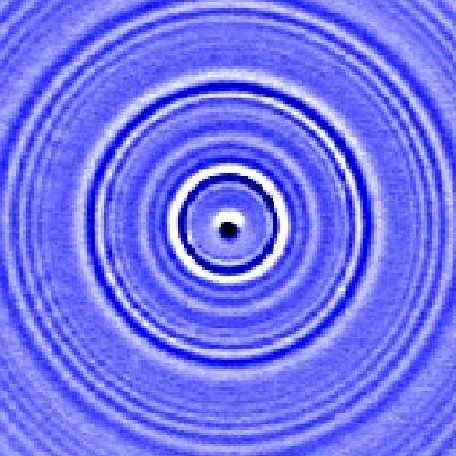
Dispersion of Rayleigh waves in a thin gold film on glass

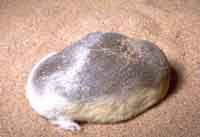
Golden mole dipping its head into sand to detect seismic waves

Seismic or vibrational communication is a process of conveying information through mechanical (seismic) vibrations of the substrate. The substrate may be the earth, a plant stem or leaf, the surface of a body of water, a spider's web, a honeycomb, or any of the myriad types of soil substrates. Seismic cues are generally conveyed by surface Rayleigh or bending waves generated through vibrations on the substrate, or acoustical waves that couple with the substrate. Vibrational communication is an ancient sensory modality and it is widespread in the animal kingdom where it has evolved several times independently. It has been reported in mammals, birds, reptiles, amphibians, insects, arachnids, crustaceans and nematode worms. Vibrations and other communication channels are not necessarily mutually exclusive, but can be used in multi-modal communication.

== Functions ==
Communication requires a sender, a message, and a recipient, although neither the sender or receiver need be present or aware of the other's intent to communicate at the time of communication.

=== Intra-specific communication ===
Vibrations can provide cues to conspecifics about specific behaviours being performed, predator warning and avoidance, herd or group maintenance, and courtship. The Middle East blind mole-rat (Spalax ehrenbergi) was the first mammal for which vibrational communication was documented. These fossorial rodents bang their head against the walls of their tunnels, which was initially interpreted as part of their tunnel building behaviour. It was eventually realised they generate temporally patterned vibrational signals for long-distance communication with neighbouring mole-rats. Footdrumming is used widely as a predator warning or defensive action. It is used primarily by fossorial or semi-fossorial rodents, but has also been recorded for spotted skunks (Spilogale putorius), deer (e.g. white-tailed deer Odocoileus virginianus), marsupials (e.g. tammar wallabies Macropus eugenii), rabbits (e.g. European rabbits Oryctolagus cuniculus) and elephant shrews (Macroscelididae). Banner-tailed kangaroo rats (Dipodomys spectabilis) footdrum in the presence of snakes as a form of individual defense and parental care. Several studies have indicated intentional use of ground vibrations as a means of intra-specific communication during courtship among the Cape mole-rat (Georychus capensis). Footdrumming has been reported to be involved in male-male competition where the dominant male indicates its resource holding potential by drumming, thus minimising physical contact with potential rivals. The Asian elephant (Elephas maximus) uses seismic communication in herd or group maintenance and many social insects use seismic vibrations to coordinate the behaviour of group members, for example in cooperative foraging. Other insects use vibrational communication to search for and attract mates, like North American treehoppers, Enchenopa binotata. Males of this species use their abdomen to send vibrations through their host plant's stem. Females perceive these signals and respond to them to initiate a duet.

=== Inter-specific communication ===
The banner-tailed kangaroo rat, (Dipodomys spectabilis), produces several complex footdrumming patterns in a number of different contexts, one of which is when it encounters a snake. The footdrumming may alert nearby offspring but most likely conveys that the rat is too alert for a successful attack, thus preventing the snake's predatory pursuit. Vibrations caused by stampeding animals may be sensed by other species to alert them to danger, thereby increasing the size of the stampede and reducing the risk of danger to an individual.

=== Eavesdropping ===
Some animals use eavesdropping to either catch their prey or to avoid being caught by predators. Some snakes are able to perceive and react to substrate-borne vibrations. The vibrations are transmitted through the lower jaw, which is often rested on the ground and is connected with the inner ear. They also detect vibrations directly with receptors on their body surface. Studies on horned desert vipers (Cerastes cerastes) showed they strongly rely on vibrational cues for capturing prey. Localisation of the prey is probably aided by the two halves of the lower jaw being independent.

Vibrational cues can even indicate the life stage of prey thereby aiding optimal prey selection by predators, e.g. larval vibrations can be distinguished from those generated by pupae, or, adults from juveniles. Although some species can conceal or mask their movements, substrate-borne vibrations are generally more difficult to avoid producing than airborne vibrations. The common angle moth (Semiothisa aemulataria) caterpillar escapes predation by lowering itself to safety by a silk thread in response to substrate-borne vibrations produced by approaching predators.

=== Mimicry ===
Several animals have learnt to capture prey species by mimicking the vibrational cues of their predators. Wood turtles (Clemmys insculpta), European herring gulls (Larus argentatus), and humans have learnt to vibrate the ground causing earthworms to rise to the surface where they can be easily caught. It is believed that deliberately produced surface vibrations mimic the seismic cues of moles moving through the ground to prey on the worms; the worms respond to these naturally produced vibrations by emerging from their burrows and fleeing across the surface.

Other animals mimic the vibrational cues of prey, only to ambush the predator when it is lured towards the mimic. Assassin bugs (Stenolemus bituberus) hunt web-building spiders by invading the web and plucking the silk to generate vibrations that mimic prey of the spider. This lures the resident spider into striking range of the bug. Spiders from at least five different families routinely invade the webs of other spiders and lure them as prey with vibratory signals (e.g. Pholcus or 'daddy long-leg' spiders; salticid 'jumping' spiders from the genera Portia, Brettus, Cyrba and Gelotia).

Portia fimbriata jumping spiders lure female Euryattus species by mimicking male courtship vibrations.

=== Habitat sensing ===
The wandering spider (Cupiennius salei) can discriminate vibrations created by rain, wind, prey, and potential mates. The creeping grasshopper can escape predation by this spider if it produces vibrations similar enough to those of wind. Thunderstorms and earthquakes produce vibrational cues; these may be used by elephants and birds to attract them to water or avoid earthquakes. Mole rats use reflected, self-generated seismic waves to detect and bypass underground obstacles – a form of "seismic echolocation".

However, this type of use is not considered communication in the strictest sense.

== Production of vibrational cues ==
Vibrational cues can be produced in three ways, through percussion (drumming) on the substrate, vibrations of the body or appendages transmitted to the substrate, or, acoustical waves that couple with the substrate. The strength of these cues depends mostly on the size and muscular power of the animal producing the signal.

Percussion

Percussion, or drumming, can produce both short-and long-distance vibrational cues. Direct percussion of the substrate can yield a much stronger signal than an airborne vocalization that couples with the substrate, however, the strength of the percussive cue is related directly to the mass of the animal producing the vibration. Large size is often associated with greater source amplitudes, leading to a greater propagation range. A wide range of vertebrates perform drumming with some part of their body either on the surface or within burrows. Individuals bang heads, rap trunks or tails, stamp or drum with front feet, hind feet or teeth, thump a gular pouch, and basically employ available appendages to create vibrations on the substrates where they live. Insects use percussion by drumming (or scraping) with the head, hind legs, fore legs, mid legs, wings, abdomen, gaster, antennae or maxillary palps.

Tremulation

Tremulation is performed by a range of insects. This process involves rocking of the entire body with the subsequent vibrations being transferred through the legs to the substrate on which the insect is walking or standing.

Stridulation

Insects and other arthropods stridulate by rubbing together two parts of the body.

A stridulating cricket.

These are referred to generically as the stridulatory organs. Vibrations are transmitted to the substrate through the legs or body.

Tymbal vibrations

Insects possess tymbals which are regions of the exoskeleton modified to form a complex membrane with thin, membranous portions and thickened "ribs". These membranes vibrate rapidly, producing audible sound and vibrations that are transmitted to the substrate.

Acoustically coupled

Elephants produce low-frequency vocalizations at high amplitudes such that they couple with the ground and travel along the surface of the earth. Direct percussion can produce a much stronger signal than airborne vocalizations that couple with the ground, as shown in the Cape mole rat and the Asian elephant. However, the power that an animal can couple into the ground at low frequencies is related directly to its mass. Animals of low mass cannot generate low-frequency vibrational surface waves; thus the mole rat could not produce a vibrational signal at 10–20 Hz like the elephant. Some invertebrates e.g. prairie mole cricket (Gryllotalpa major), bushcricket (Tettigoniidae), and cicada produce acoustic communications and substrate vibrations that may be due to acoustic coupling.

For acoustic coupling, low-frequency, high-amplitude vocalizations are necessary for long-distance transmission. It has been suggested that other large mammals such as the lion and rhinoceros may produce acoustically coupled vibrational cues similar to elephants.

== Reception of vibrational cues ==
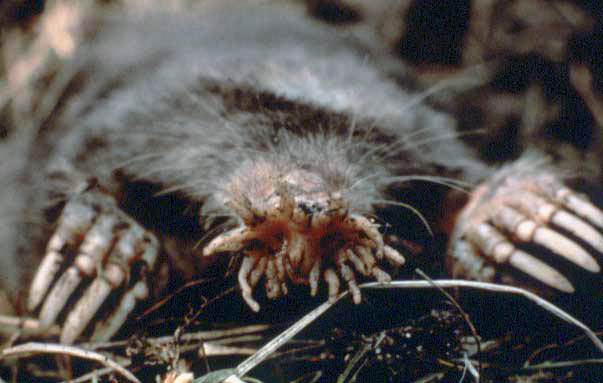
The star-nose mole

Vibrational cues are detected by various body parts. Snakes receive signals by sensors in the lower jaw or body, invertebrates by sensors in the legs or body (earthworms), birds by sensors in the legs (pigeons) or bill-tip (shorebirds, kiwis and ibises), mammals by sensors in the feet or lower jaw (mole rats) and kangaroos by sensors in the legs. The star-nosed mole (Condylura cristata), has evolved an elaborate nose structure which may detect seismic waves.

The sensory organs are generically known as somatosensory mechanoreceptors. In insects these sensors are known as campaniform sensillae located near the joints, the subgenual organ in the tibia and Johnston's organ located in the antennae. Arachnids use slit sense organ. In vertebrate animals the sensors are Pacinian corpuscles in placental mammals, similar lamellated corpuscles in marsupials, Herbst corpuscles in birds and a variety of encapsulated or naked nerve endings in other animals.

These sensory receivers detect vibrations in the skin and joints, from which they are typically transmitted as nerve impulses (action potentials) to and through spinal nerves to the spinal cord and then the brain; in snakes, the nerve impulses could be carried through cranial nerves. Alternatively, the sensory receivers may be centralized in the cochlea of the inner ear. Vibrations are transmitted from the substrate to the cochlea through the body (bones, fluids, cartilage, etc.) in an 'extra-tympanic' pathway that bypasses the eardrum, and sometimes, even the middle ear. Vibrations then project to the brain along with cues from airborne sound received by the eardrum.

== Propagation of vibrational cues ==
Documented cases of vibrational communication are almost exclusively restricted to Rayleigh waves or bending waves. Seismic energy in the form of Rayleigh waves transmits most efficiently between 10 and 40 Hz. This is the range in which elephants may communicate seismically. In areas with little to no human-generated seismic noise, frequencies around 20 Hz are relatively noise-free, other than vibrations associated with thunder or earth tremors, making it a reasonably quiet communication channel. Both airborne and vibrational waves are subject to interference and alteration from environmental factors. Factors such as wind and temperature influence airborne sound propagation, whereas propagation of seismic signals are affected by the substrate type and heterogeneity. Airborne sound waves spread spherically rather than cylindrically, attenuate more rapidly (losing 6 dB for every doubling of distance) than ground surface waves such as Rayleigh waves (3 dB loss for every doubling of distance), and thus ground surface waves maintain integrity longer. Vibrational signals are probably not very costly to produce for small animals, whereas the generation of air-borne sound is limited by body size.

Benefits and costs of vibrational communication to the signaler are dependent on the function of the signal. For social signaling, daylight and line-of-sight are not required for seismic communication as they are for visual signaling. Likewise, flightless individuals may spend less time locating a potential mate by following the most direct route defined by substrate-borne vibrations, rather than by following sound or chemicals deposited on the path.

Most insects are herbivorous and usually live on plants, therefore the majority of vibrational signals are transmitted through plant stems. Here, communication typically ranges from 0.3 m-2.0 m. It has been suggested that vibrational signals might be adapted to transmit through particular plants.

== Insect mating ==
Many insects use vibrational communication in mating. In the case of Macrolophus pygmaeus, the males produce two different vibrational sounds intentionally while the females produce none. The males produce two different vibrations, a yelp and a roar. The yelps are produced before copulation. Trialeurodes vaporariorum males also use vibrations to communicate during mating. They produce two types of vibrations, a "chirp", and a "pulse" and occur in different stages throughout the mating ritual. The occurrence of the male signals can change due to male rivalry as well. The frequencies and quality of the vibrational calls can change, for example, a higher quality with lower frequency characterizes an aggressive call. The frequencies can also change to avoid signal overlapping which can lower male responsiveness.

== Insect feeding ==
The use of vibrational communication for feeding is separated in different areas. Depending on the insect, for example a C. pinguis the process in finding new feeding grounds is quite a process. The little treehoppers have a dance which indicates the need to find a new feeding area, and will communicate through vibrations to send a scout to find the new area. Once this scout has been sent it sends vibrations back to the main group, which then moves over to the new area. There is other evidence that it is seemingly instinctual for insects to follow a path that has vibrations, even if they are artificially created in a lab. Caterpillar larvae also send vibrations that help attract others to their feeding locations. This is done at the same time that they are eating. This type of signal was made by them scraping little hairs on the hind side, which is called anal scraping. Caterpillars do this while eating as they can multitask and share their location with other larvae.

== Male-male interactions in insects ==
Vibrational communication is also used in competition. Macrolophus pygmaeus produces a vibrational sound called a "yelp" that is associated with male-male interactions. The yelp is also associated with physical contact between the two males, and then the males running away while emitting yelps. The duration of the signal as well can affect the female's response, and it was shown that females typically prefer longer calls. Sometimes insects can tell the fitness of a potential mate by their vibrational signals. The stonefly Pteronarcella badia uses vibrational communication in mating. The female stonefly can understand the fitness of males that are "duetting" her vibrational signals by timing how long it takes for the male to find her location.

== Examples ==
=== American alligator ===
During courtship, male American alligators use their near-infrasound capabilities to bellow to females, assuming a "reverse-arch" posture at the water's surface (head and tail slightly elevated, midsection barely breaking the surface) using near-infrasound to literally make the water's surface "sprinkle" as they bellow, usually termed as their "water dance" during the mating season.

=== White-lipped frog ===
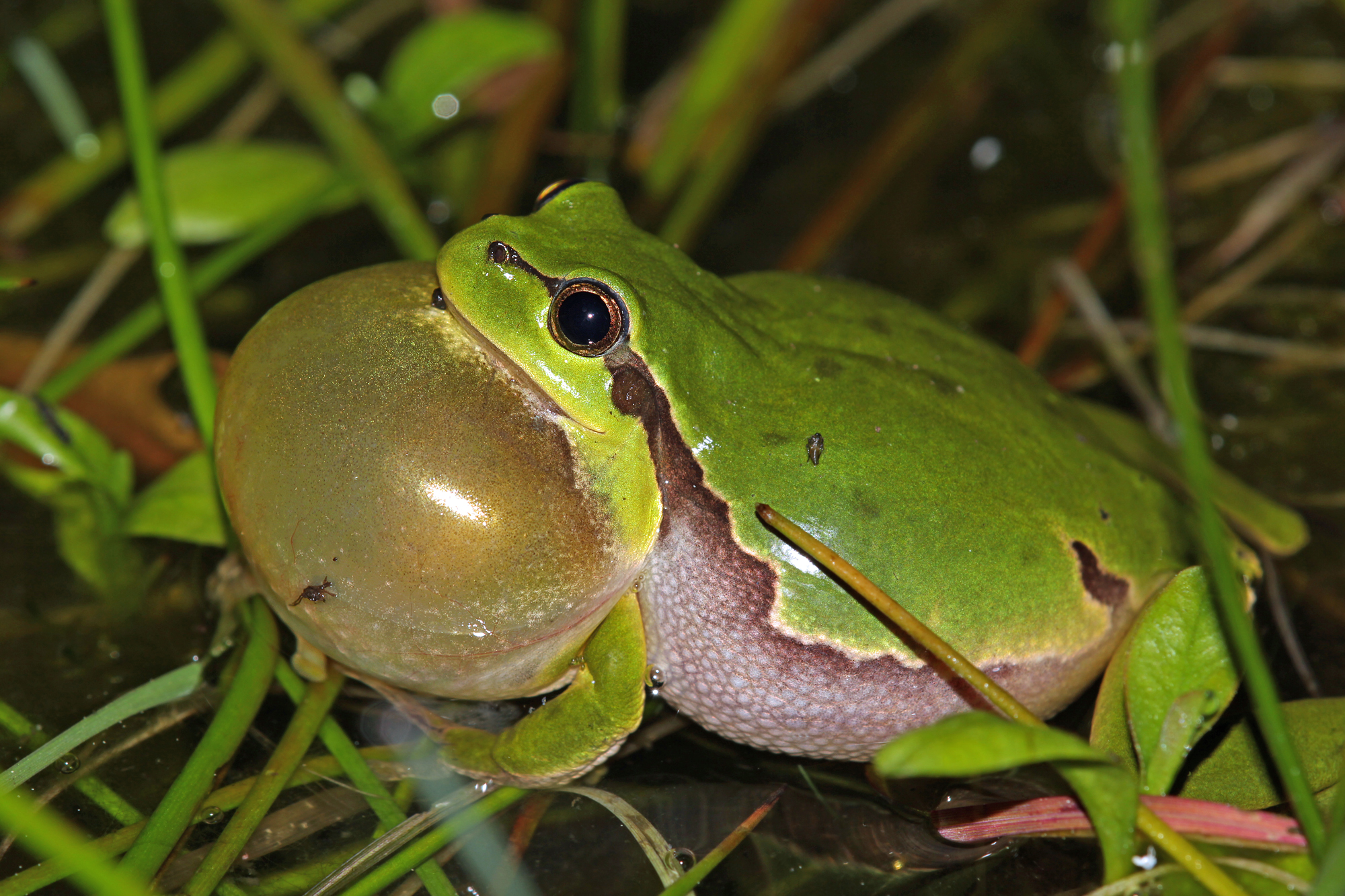
European tree frog with distended gular pouch

One of the earliest reports of vertebrate signaling using vibrational communication is the bimodal system of sexual advertisement of the white-lipped frog (Leptodactylus albilabris). Males on the ground sing airborne advertisement songs that target receptive females, but instead of supporting themselves on their front limbs as other frogs often do, they partially bury themselves in soft soil. As they inflate their vocal sacs to produce the airborne call, the gular pouch impacts the soil as a 'thump' that sets up Rayleigh waves which propagate 3–6 m through the substrate. Advertising males space themselves at distances of 1–2 m, thus, the nearest neighbour males are able to receive and respond to substrate-borne vibrations created by other males.

=== Namib Desert golden mole ===
Predators may use vibrational communication to detect and capture prey. The Namib Desert golden mole (Eremitalpa granti namibensis) is a blind mammal whose eyelids fuse early in development. The ear lacks a pinna, the reduced ear opening is hidden under fur and the organization of the middle ear indicates it would be sensitive to vibrational cues. The Namib Desert golden mole actively forages at night by dipping its head and shoulders into the sand in conjunction with 'sand swimming' as it navigates in search of termite prey producing head-banging alarms. Experimental evidence supports the hypothesis that substrate-borne vibrations produced as wind blows through grassy hummocks influence these moles as they forage on termites associated with the grassy mounds, which are spaced at distances of 20–25 m. The exact mechanism of extracting directional information from the vibrations has not been confirmed.

=== Elephants ===
Elephant producing low frequency rumbles

In the late 1990s, Caitlin O'Connell-Rodwell first argued that elephants communicate over long distances using low-pitched rumbles that are barely audible to humans. Further pioneering research in elephant infrasound communication was done by Katy Payne of the Elephant Listening Project and detailed in her book Silent Thunder. This research is helping our understanding of behaviours such as how elephants can find distant potential mates and how social groups are able to coordinate their movements over extensive ranges. Joyce Poole has also begun decoding elephant utterances that have been recorded over many years of observation, hoping to create a lexicon based on a systematic catalogue of elephant sounds.

Seismic energy transmits most efficiently between 10–40 Hz, i.e. in the same range as the fundamental frequency and 2nd harmonic of an elephant rumble. For Asian elephants, these calls have a frequency of 14–24 Hz, with sound pressure levels of 85–90 dB and last 10–15 seconds. For African elephants, calls range from 15–35 Hz and can be as loud as 117 dB, allowing communication over many kilometers. It seems that when an elephant rumbles, the infrasound that is produced couples with the surface of the earth and then propagates through the ground. In this way, elephants are able to use seismic vibrations at infrasound frequencies for communication. These vibrations can be detected by the skin of an elephant's feet and trunk, which relay the resonant vibrations, similar to the skin on a drum. To listen attentively, individuals will lift one foreleg from the ground, possibly triangulating the source, and face the source of the sound. Occasionally, attentive elephants can be seen to lean forward, putting more weight on their front feet. These behaviours presumably increase the ground contact and sensitivity of the legs. Sometimes, the trunk will be laid on the ground.

Elephants possess several adaptations suited for vibratory communication. The cushion pads of the feet contain cartilaginous nodes and have similarities to the acoustic fat (melon) found in marine mammals like toothed whales and sirenians. In addition, the annular muscle surrounding the ear canal can constrict the passageway, thereby dampening acoustic signals and allowing the animal to hear more seismic signals.

Elephants appear to use vibrational communication for a number of purposes. An elephant running or mock charging can create seismic signals that can be heard at great distances. Vibrational waveforms produced by locomotion appear to travel at distances of up to 32 km (20 mi) while those from vocalizations travel 16 km (9.9 mi). When detecting the vibrational cues of an alarm call signaling danger from predators, elephants enter a defensive posture and family groups will congregate. Vibrational cues are also thought to aid their navigation by use of external sources of infrasound. After the 2004 Boxing Day tsunami in Asia, there were reports that trained elephants in Thailand had become agitated and fled to higher ground before the devastating wave struck, thus saving their own lives and those of the tourists riding on their backs. Because earthquakes and tsunamis generate low-frequency waves, O'Connell-Rodwell and other elephant experts have begun to explore the possibility that the Thai elephants were responding to these events.

=== Tree Hopper ===
Calloconophora pinguis use vibrational communication in order to help others of its species find food. They prefer newly growing leaves and need at least two or more new feeding areas while developing from larvae to adulthood. C. pinguis use vibrational communication which seems to be a form of running in place and bumping into others on the same stem. Once this occurs, a chain reaction follows until one finally leaves to scout another stem. This behavior is similar to honeybees, which have scouts for food locating. Once finding a suitable growing stem for the other C. pinguis larvae, it begins to send short vibrations to the old site. Once the group is together, a similar process occurs again when it runs out of food.

=== Pill Bug ===
Armadillidium officinalis, these isopods are able to use their legs in order to produce stridulations. This allows them to communicate with each other when feeding, looking for other food sources, as well as using their stridulations in means of a mating call. Another reason the pill bugs use their stridulations to communicate is to let others know that there are predators nearby.

=== Honey Bee ===
Apis mellifera, use vibrational signals called tooting and quacking to communicate. This happens primarily on virgin queen cells when there are multiple queens in the hive. Vibrational signals performed on virgin queens after they emerged from the queen cells are connected to their success in the elimination period.

=== Mole Cricket ===
Gryllotalpa orientalis make vibrational cues by scraping the forelegs, tapping the forelegs, pal-pal taps, and tremulation. The functions are unknown but it is known that they are not for mating or sexual selection. Gryllotalpa major (prairie mole crickets), however, use underground vibrational cues as one part of their mating call.

=== "Tok-Tok" Beetle ===
Psammodes striatus repeatedly taps its abdomen on the ground, sending vibrational cues to communicate with other beetles. In male-female communication, the male typically initiates the tapping. The female responds by tapping as well, and as the communication continues, the female stays in place while the male tries to locate her.

== See also ==
- Animal communication
- Bioacoustics
- Biotremology
- Hearing range
- Infrasound
- Lateral line
- Sense
