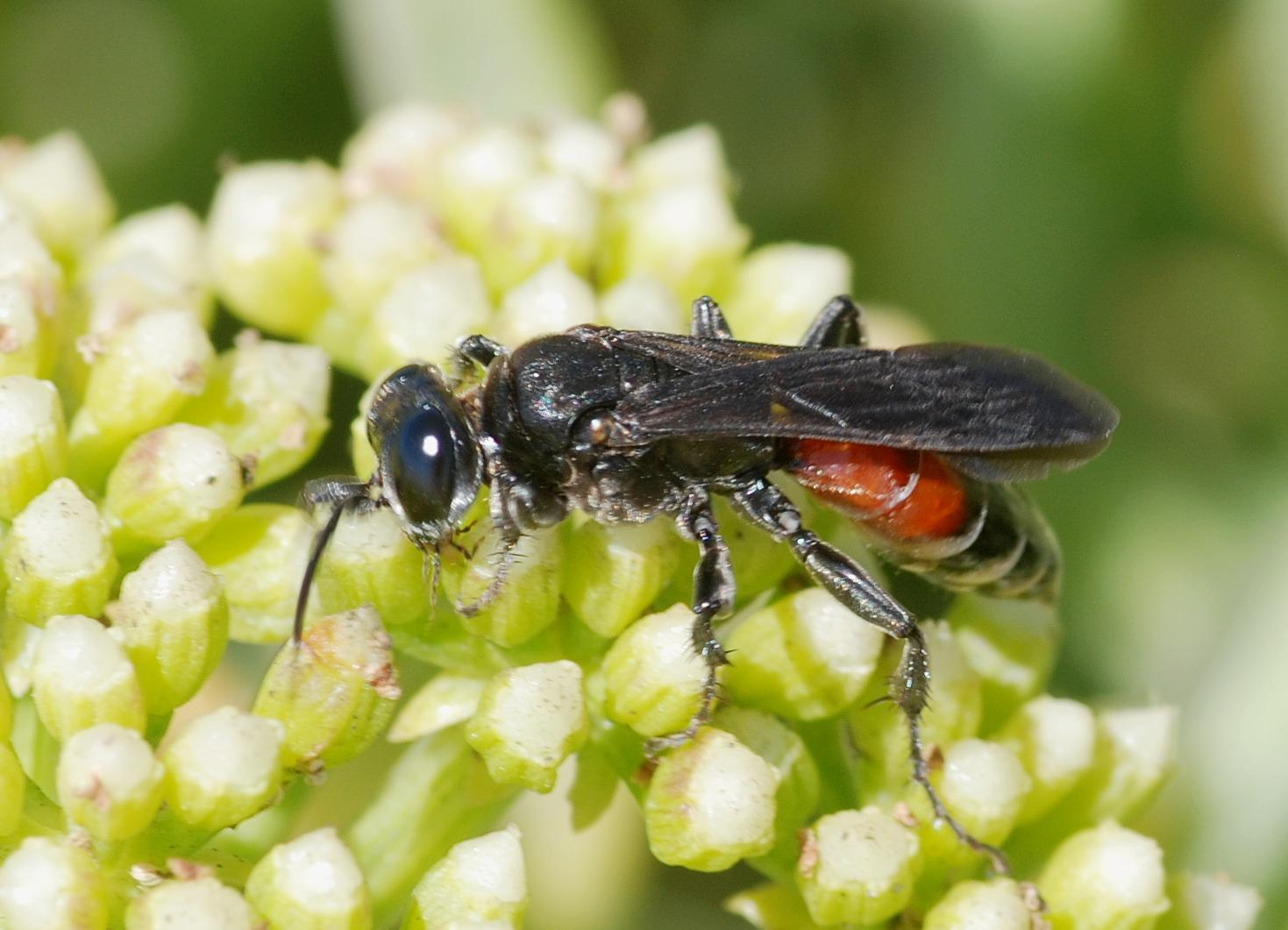

Scientific classification
- Kingdom: Animalia
- Phylum: Arthropoda
- Clade: Pancrustacea
- Class: Insecta
- Order: Hymenoptera
- Family: Crabronidae
- Genus: Larra
- Species: L. anathema

Binomial name
- Larra anathema (Rossi, 1790)

Synonyms
- Sphex anathema Rossi 1790

= Larra anathema =

Species of wasp

Larra anathema is a species of parasitoid wasps belonging to the family Crabronidae. It is the type species of the genus Larra.

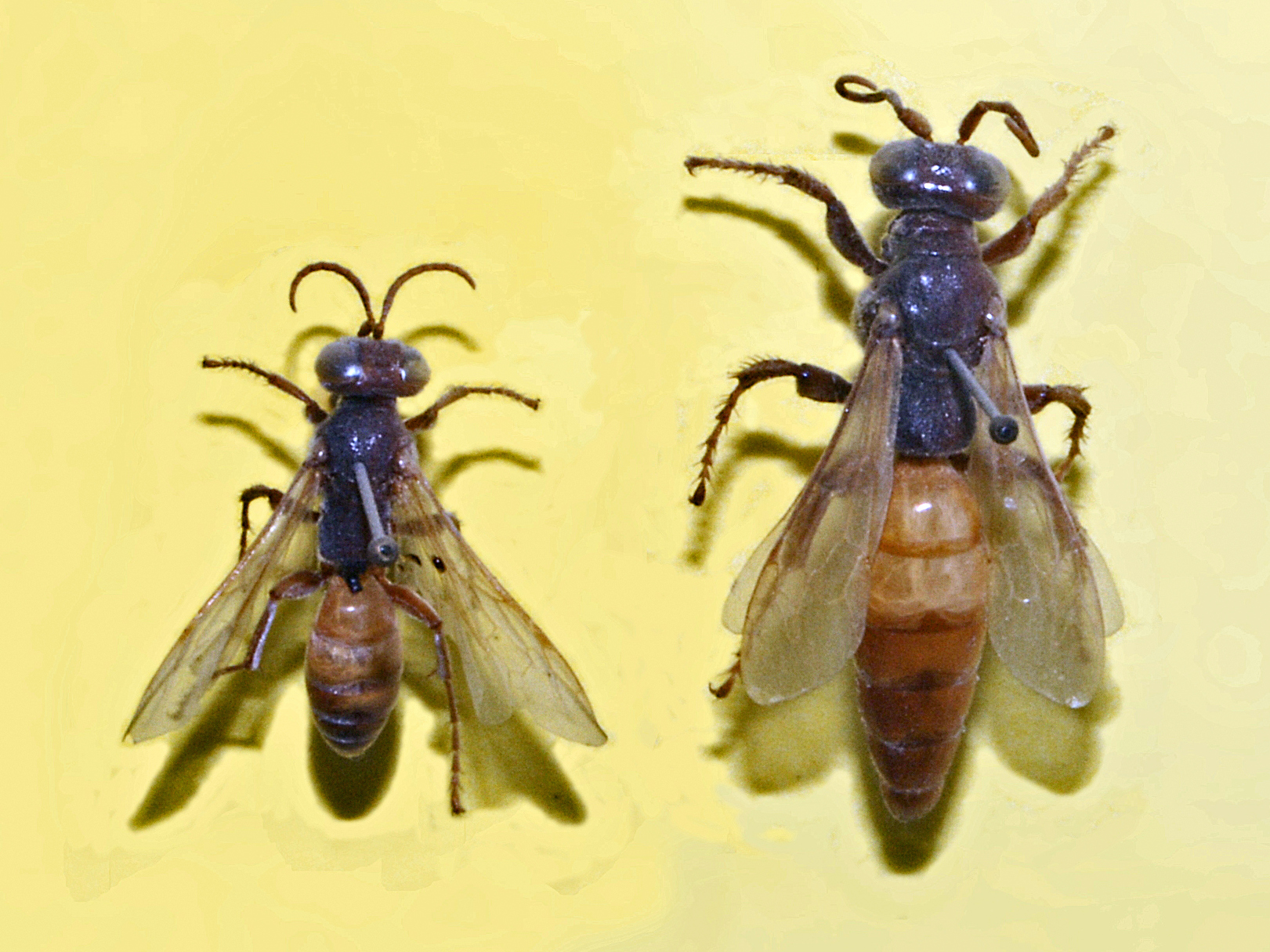
Larra anathema. Male and female. Museum specimen

== Subspecies ==
Larra anathema has the following subspecies:

- Larra anathema anathema (Rossi, 1790)
- Larra anathema melanaria Kohl, 1880
- Larra anathema nudiventris A. Costa, 1893

== Description ==
Larra anathema can reach a length of 16–24 millimetres (0.63–0.94 in) in the females, of 12–17 millimetres (0.47–0.67 in) in the males. The body is mainly black, but the first and second tergite of the abdomen are reddish brown. The wings are dark brown or black. Anteriorly the first antennal segment is reddish.

== Biology ==
The females hunt European mole crickets (Gryllotalpa gryllotalpa) stinging and paralyzing them. Larvae feed upon their host.

== Distribution ==
This species is widespread in North Africa, in Southern and Central Europe and in Turkey. It has been introduced in Hawaii for biological pest control. These wasps prefer dry habitats.

== Bibliography ==
- Rolf Witt: Wespen. Beobachten, Bestimmen. Naturbuch-Verlag, Augsburg 1998, ISBN 3-89440-243-1.
