= Frej Ossiannilsson =

Swedish entomologist

- Born: December 8, 1908; Helsingborg, Sweden
- Died: March 6, 1995 (aged 86); Uppsala, Sweden
- Citizenship: Sweden
- Education: University of Lund
- Spouse: Ingegärd Malström (m. 1938–1995)
- Children: Maj Ossiannilsson
- Scientific career
- Fields: entomology, biotremology
- Workplaces: Swedish University of Agricultural Sciences
- Thesis: Insect drummers. A study on the morphology and function of the sound-producing organ of Swedish Homoptera Auchenorrhyncha with notes on their sound production (1949)

Frej Ossiannilsson (December 8, 1908 – March 6, 1995) was a Swedish entomologist who specialized in Auchenorrhyncha, and is known also for discovering vibrational communication of insects. He is considered a pioneer of biotremology for work on behavioural and anatomical basis of vibrational communication.

== Early life and education ==
He was born as the eldest of five children to the writer Karl Gustav Ossiannilsson and his wife Naemi. After home schooling, he did military service and later enrolled at the Lund University, starting his work on insects. Ossiannilsson's first published paper (1934) dealt with the fauna of Auchenorrhyncha in Sweden. The following year he graduated and met his future wife Ingegärd Malström, with whom he married in 1938. That year, their daughter Maj was born.

== Career ==
When World War II broke out, he was conscripted, but he continued doing entomological work in Sweden. To bolster the family's income, he secured a temporary position as an assistant at the National Institute of Plant Protection (Institutet för växtskydd). The position became permanent in 1940, so he moved his family to Stockholm. Working as a general and applied entomologist, Ossiannilsson spent most of the time determining various pest insects, but Auchenorrhyncha as a group remained his specialty. Among other works at that time, he published a complete fauna of Auchenorrhyncha in Sweden.

His interest was piqued by the claim that leafhoppers and planthoppers were silent, unlike the closely related cicada. However, he observed that members of the former two groups also possess tymbals with which cicadas produce sound, so he proposited that the sound is simply too faint to hear. He put an adult leafhopper in a glass tube and pushed the tube in his ear, after which he was able to detect faint vibrations. Thus, he discovered a new form of insect communication. He performed behavioural experiments with which he demonstrated that vibrations, not sound per se, were involved in male-female courtship, and completed an anatomical study of vibration-producing structures in numerous species. This work was to become his doctoral thesis, and was published as Insect drummers. A study on the morphology and function of the sound-producing organ of Swedish Homoptera Auchenorrhyncha with notes on their sound production (1949). Ossiannilsson even managed to record these vibrations and a phonograph record was produced. However, the theory that insects transfer information using substrate-borne vibrations was largely ignored by his contemporaries. Nine years later, this work was continued by the German entomologist Hildegard Strübing, and later other researchers who established the basis of biotremology.

In the meantime, Ossiannilsson became an assistant professor at the Agricultural college in Uppsala (now part of the Swedish University of Agricultural Sciences) and later full professor. There, he started working on the taxonomy of aphids, later returning to Auchenorrhyncha. He published several monographs on these groups for the series Fauna Entomologica Scandinavica. He created a collection of over 20,000 mounted specimens before retiring in 1974, but he continued taxonomical work even after that, expanding his interest to Psylloidea.

== Final years ==
Most of Ossiannilsson's free time was devoted to field collecting Auchenorrhyncha as well. Beside entomology, his interests were art and gardening. After his last publication in 1992, he suffered a stroke which left him half paralyzed, so he quit researching. His wife looked after him until his death in 1995. His contribution to science is now recognized, among others, by the community of biotremologists who established the Insect Drummer Award for esteemed researchers.
