= List of bioacoustics software =

The following is a list of some referenced bioacoustics software.

Bio-acoustic software
Name	License	Platform	Details
Audacity	GPL v2	Linux, Macintosh, Windows	General purpose audio editing tool.
Anabat Insight	Proprietary	Windows, Macintosh	Designed for bat call analysis; allows users to view, listen to, manage, search, analyse, and report on recordings in full spectrum or zero crossing. Includes a plugin to Bat Classify.
Avisoft SASLab Pro	Proprietary	Windows	Contains tools for automatically measuring parameters such as duration and frequency.
BCID	Proprietary	Windows	Identification software for zero-crossing and full-spectrum bat calls.
Luscinia	GPL v2	Linux, Macintosh, Windows	File recorder, editor, and manager. Displays spectrograms of sound; allows database archiving of wildlife sound recordings; computational comparison of sound using dynamic time warping; clustering analysis; syntactical analysis of animal vocal signals; visual comparison of spectrograms.
Praat	GPL v2	Linux, Macintosh, Windows	Functions: Speech analysis (spectrograms, pitch, formant, and intensity analysis, and other metrics), labelling and segmentation of signal (ex. using the phonetic alphabet), learning algorithms (feedforward neural networks and discrete and stochastic Optimality Theory), graphics (produce PNG, PDF, and EPS files), speech synthesis, listening experiments, speech manipulation (change pitch and duration contours and filtering), statistics (multidimensional scaling, principle components analysis, discriminant analysis), and programmability (uses an "easy programmable scripting language")
Raven	Proprietary	Linux, Macintosh, Windows	Program for the acquisition, visualization, measurement, and analysis of sounds.
SeaWave & SeaPro	Proprietary	Windows	Software for sound recording with real-time high-resolution spectrographic display – File Analysis and replay at different speed – up to 192 kHz with standard audio boards – time-aligned file splitting to record continuously for days and weeks. The research version supports up to 16 channels. Compatible with Dodotronic UltraMic 200k and 250k ultrasonic USB microphones.
Sonobat	Proprietary	Macintosh, Windows	Provides a comprehensive tool for analyzing and comparing high-resolution full-spectrum sonogram of bat echolocation calls recorded from time-expansion bat detectors.
Sound Analysis Pro 2011	GPL v2	Windows	Performs automated recording and analysis of animal vocalization. It can record, analyze and manage sound data over prolonged periods.
SoundRuler	GPL v2	Linux, Macintosh, Windows	Focused on teaching acoustics. Can record and edit.
Syrinx-PC	Freeware	Windows	Program is specifically designed for field use for recording bioacoustics. Has basic analysis capabilities. Can be used to record/edit/analyze/manage.
Song Scope	Proprietary	Linux, Macintosh, Windows	An easy-to-use spectrogram viewer. Also allows the building of "recognizers" to automatically search field recordings for specific animal vocalizations.
Kaleidoscope	Proprietary	Linux, Macintosh, Windows	Kaleidoscope is an integrated suite of bioacoustics tools which allows converting file formats, viewing spectrograms, creating classifiers for birds, bats, frogs, and other species, sorting and categorizing bat data by species in North America, Europe, South Africa and the Neotropics, and generating reports.
Bioacoustics	GPL v3	Linux, Macintosh, Windows	Bioacoustics is a free R package available in CRAN to analyze audio recordings and automatically extract animal vocalizations. ItcContains all the necessary tools to process audio recordings of various formats (e.g., WAV, WAC, MP3, ZC), filter noisy files, display audio signals, detect and extract automatically acoustic features for further analysis such as classification."
monitoR	GPL v2	Linux, Macintosh, Windows	monitoR is a package for use in R, and is available for free from CRAN. From its description: "Acoustic template detection and monitoring database interface. Create, modify, save, and use templates for detection of animal vocalizations. View, verify, and extract results. Upload a MySQL schema to a existing instance, manage survey metadata, write and read templates and detections locally or to the database."
seewave	GPL v2	Linux, Macintosh, Windows	seewave is a package for use in R, and is available from CRAN. From its description: "seewave provides functions for analysing, manipulating, displaying, editing and synthesizing time waves (particularly sound). This package processes time analysis (oscillograms and envelopes), spectral content, resonance quality factor, entropy, cross correlation and autocorrelation, zero-crossing, dominant frequency, analytic signal, frequency coherence, 2D and 3D spectrograms and many other analyses."
BatScope 4	Freeware	Macintosh & Windows	Archiving, data management, analysis of sound recordings for bat surveys. Supports files primarily from BatLogger, but also BatCorder and standard .wav files.
BatExplorer	Proprietary, Freeware	Windows	Archiving, data management, analysis of sound recordings for bat surveys. Supports only files from BatLogger.
bcAdmin-bcAnalyze-batident	Proprietary	Macintosh	Archiving, data management, analysis of sound recordings for bat surveys. Supports bat corder raw and wave files.
PAMGuard	GPL v3	Windows (parts will run under Linux)	Open Source software for the Detection Classification and Localisation (DCL) of marine mammal sounds. Can process hydrophone data in real time or can process files offline. Interactive displays allow the user to annotate data and link sounds for tracking using target motion analysis.
AviaNZ	GPL v3	Linux, Macintosh, Windows	Open source software for bioacoustic analysis, focusing on automatic processing of long-term recordings. Includes pre-built detectors for several species of New Zealand bats and birds, and allows creating detectors for any other sounds.
OpenEcho	GPL v3	Linux, Macintosh, Windows	First open source tool for AI-assisted bioacoustic analysis of long-term bat recordings.
Spectrolipi	GPL v3	Web	Client-side web application for bioacoustics spectrogram annotation. Direct Xeno-canto integration. Tools to semi-automate the annotation process.

== See also ==
- Free software
- Open-Source Software
- General Public License (GPL)
