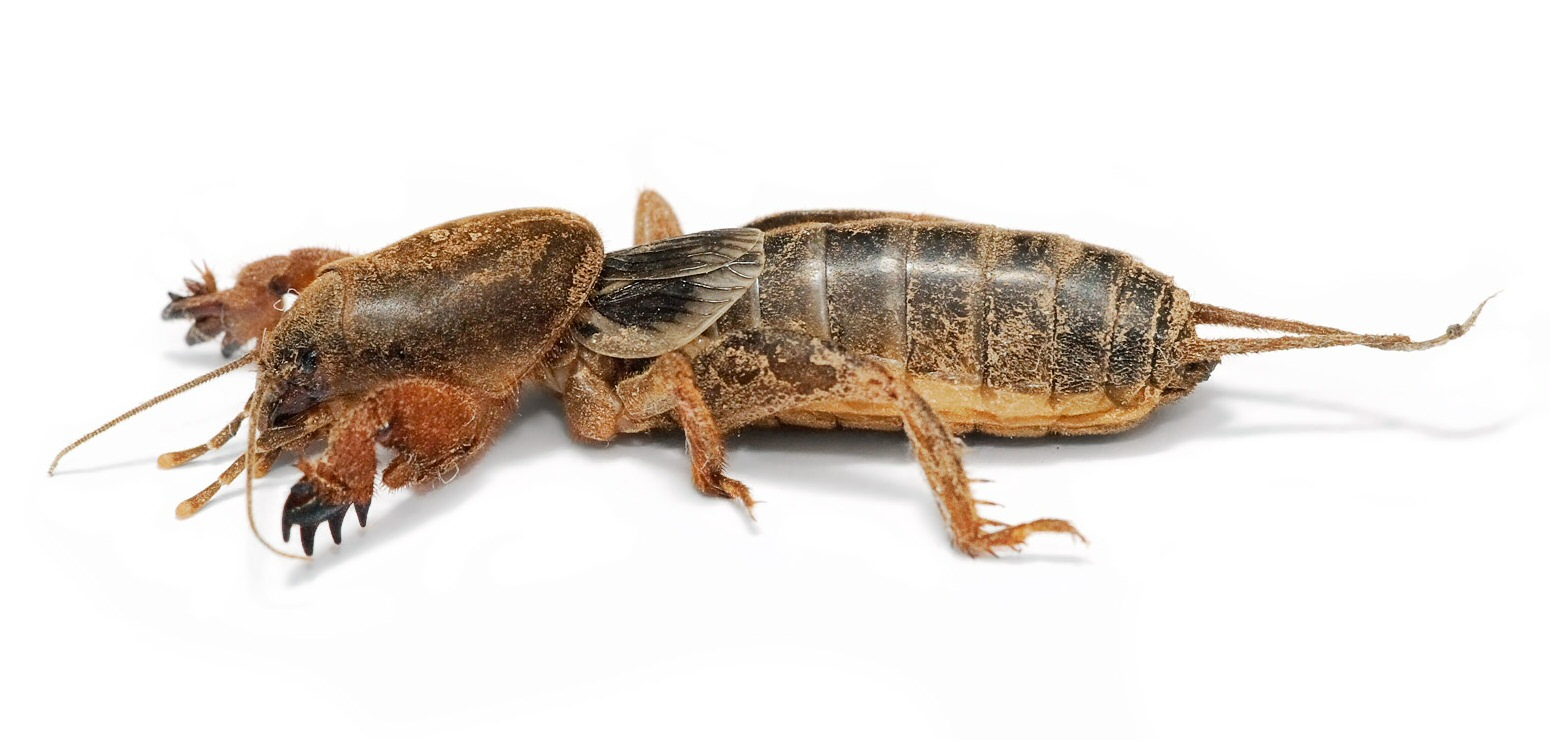

Scientific classification
- Domain: Eukaryota
- Kingdom: Animalia
- Phylum: Arthropoda
- Class: Insecta
- Order: Orthoptera
- Suborder: Ensifera
- Family: Gryllotalpidae
- Genus: Gryllotalpa
- Species: G. brachyptera

Binomial name
- Gryllotalpa brachyptera Tindale, 1928

= Gryllotalpa brachyptera =

Species of cricket-like animal

Gryllotalpa brachyptera is a mole cricket, native to Australia (New South Wales and Sydney).
