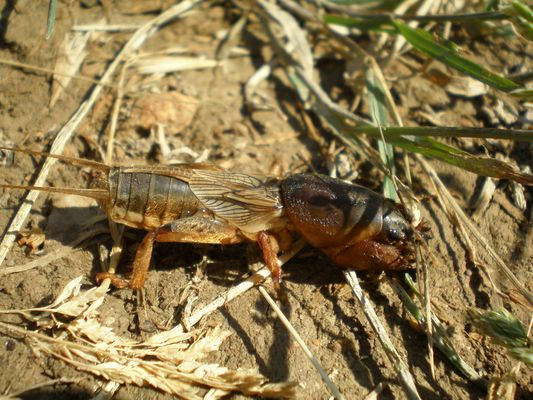

Conservation status
- Data Deficient (IUCN 3.1)

Scientific classification
- Kingdom: Animalia
- Phylum: Arthropoda
- Class: Insecta
- Order: Orthoptera
- Suborder: Ensifera
- Family: Gryllotalpidae
- Genus: Gryllotalpa
- Species: G. septemdecimchromosomica

Binomial name
- Gryllotalpa septemdecimchromosomica Ortiz, 1958

Synonyms
- Gryllotalpa 17-chromosomica Ortiz, 1958

= Gryllotalpa septemdecimchromosomica =

Species of cricket-like animal

Gryllotalpa septemdecimchromosomica is a species of mole cricket, in the G. gryllotalpa species group, found in Spain and France: where it may be known as le courtillière Provençale. No subspecies are listed in the Catalogue of Life.
