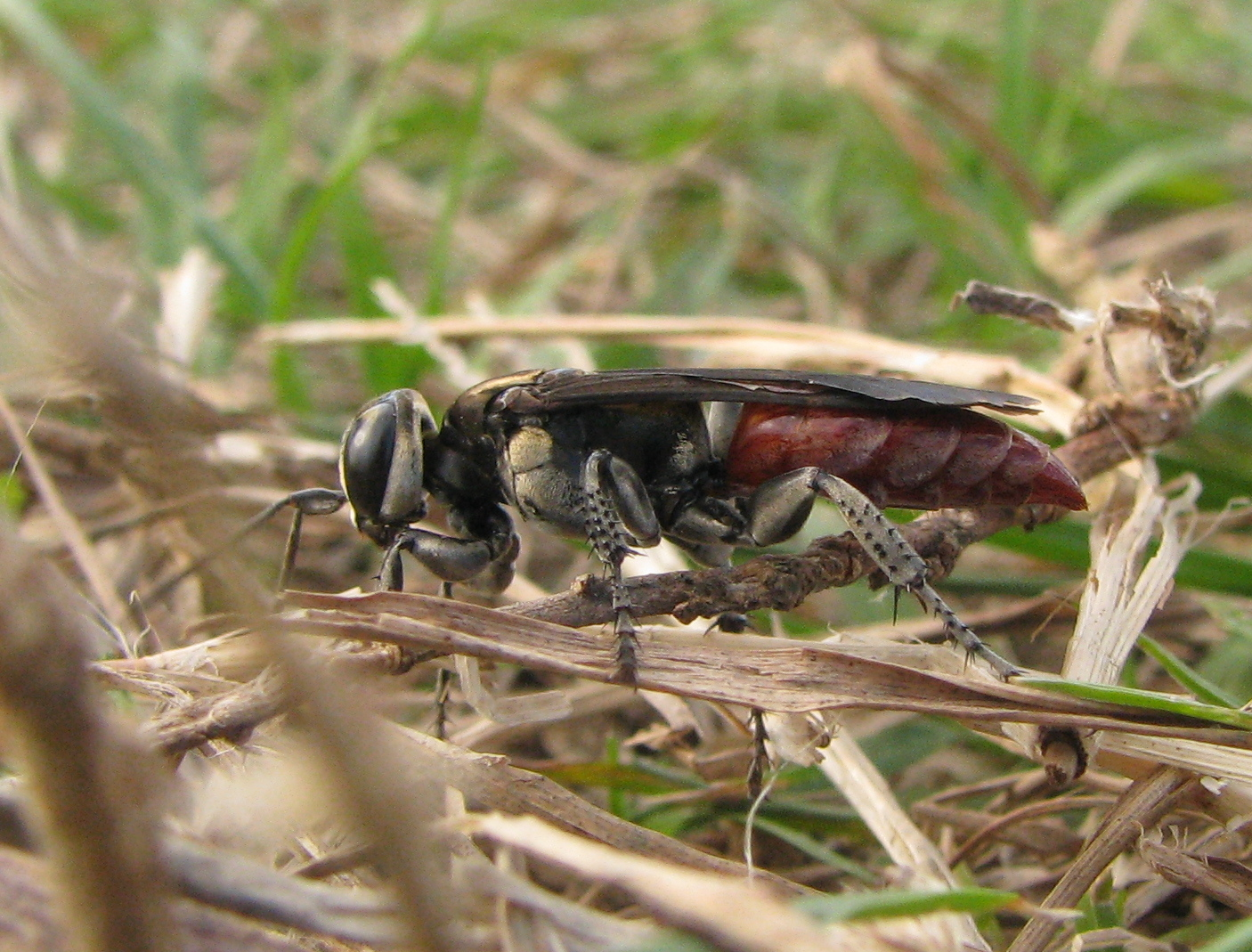
- Larra bicolor

Scientific classification
- Domain: Eukaryota
- Kingdom: Animalia
- Phylum: Arthropoda
- Class: Insecta
- Order: Hymenoptera
- Family: Crabronidae
- Subtribe: Larrina
- Genus: Larra; Fabricius, 1793

Species
- About 64, see text

= Larra (wasp) =

Genus of insects

Larra, also known as mole cricket wasps or mole cricket hunters, is a genus of wasps that prey on various species of mole crickets. They have gained prominence as integrated pest management agents.

== Distribution ==
Members of this genus are found worldwide, particularly in the tropics.

== Life cycle ==
Larra wasps feed on nectar as adults. Female wasps hunt adult or late-instar mole crickets and lay their eggs upon them, first temporarily paralyzing them by stinging them on the underside. The larva, upon hatching, gradually consumes the host, eventually killing it. It then pupates in or near the remains. The adults are solitary and do not form colonies. Incubation and development are highly variable in length and dependent upon temperature; in winter, the larvae may enter diapause. Each Larra species preferentially hunts a particular set of prey species, even when related prey is available.

The temporary paralysis of the host is a distinctive feature of the genus out of its close allies. Other related wasps generally paralyze the host permanently and bury it so that the larva can consume it undisturbed.

== Human importance ==
Larra polita, which is endemic to the Philippines, was successfully introduced to Hawaii in 1925 to help control Gryllotalpa orientalis, the oriental mole cricket.

A related species, L. bicolor, was introduced to Puerto Rico in 1928 to control the accidentally introduced Neoscapteriscus didactylus, the Changa mole cricket. Subsequent efforts were made to introduce L. bicolor to Florida for the same reason, and a population was established by 1993.

== Species ==
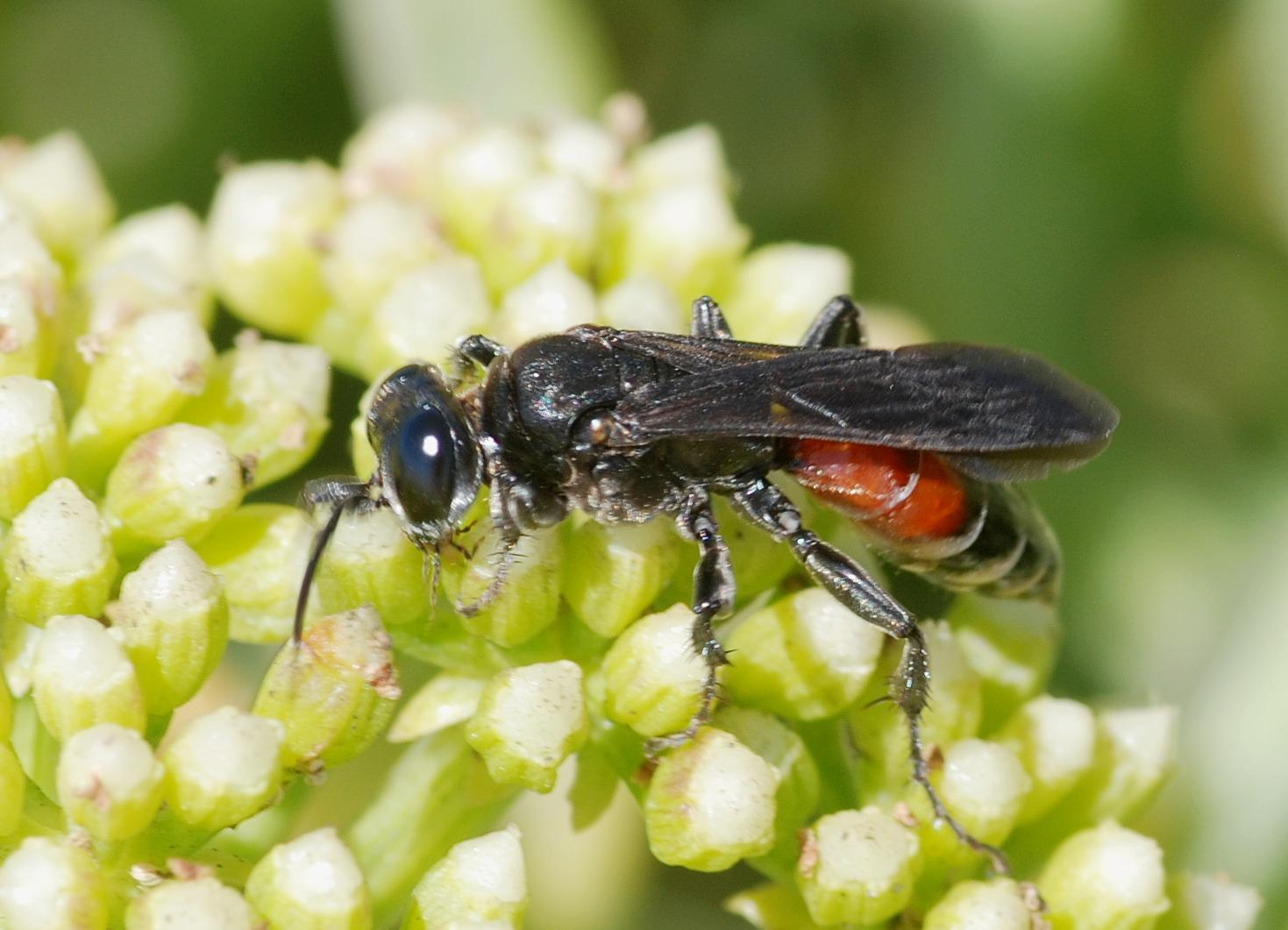
Larra anathema

There are 64 described species of Larra.

- Larra abdominalis Guérin-Méneville in Lefebvre, 1849
- Larra alecto (F. Smith, 1858)
- Larra altamazonica F. Williams, 1928
- Larra amplipennis (F. Smith, 1873)
- Larra analis Fabricius, 1804
- Larra anathema (Rossi, 1790)
- Larra angustifrons Kohl, 1892
- Larra apicipennis Cameron, 1904
- Larra aponis Tsuneki, 1983
- Larra arabica Schmid-Egger, 2014
- Larra betsilea de Saussure, 1887
- Larra bicolor Fabricius, 1804
- Larra bicolorata Cameron, 1904
- Larra bulawayoensis Bischoff, 1913
- Larra burmeisterii (Holmberg, 1884)
- Larra carbonaria (F. Smith, 1858)
- Larra cassandra Schrottky, 1902
- Larra coelestina (F. Smith, 1873)
- Larra corrugata R. Turner, 1912
- Larra diversa (Walker, 1871)
- Larra dorsalis Tsuneki, 1982
- Larra dux (Kohl, 1892)
- Larra erratica Bingham, 1897
- Larra erythropyga R. Turner, 1916
- Larra extrema Dahlbom, 1845
- Larra femorata (de Saussure, 1854)
- Larra fenchihuensis Tsuneki, 1967
- Larra fuscinerva Cameron, 1900
- Larra glabrata (F. Smith, 1856)
- Larra godmani Cameron, 1889
- Larra heydenii (de Saussure, 1890)
- Larra iliensis Kazenas, 1978
- Larra impressifrons Arnold, 1923
- Larra madecassa de Saussure, 1887
- Larra mansueta (F. Smith, 1865)
- Larra maura (Fabricius, 1787)
- Larra mediterranea Gistel, 1857
- Larra melania Tsuneki, 1982
- Larra melanocnemis R. Turner, 1916
- Larra melanoptera Kohl, 1884
- Larra mendax (F. Smith, 1865)
- Larra mundula Kohl, 1894
- Larra neaera Nurse, 1903
- Larra nigripes (Fabricius, 1793)
- Larra obscurior Dalla Torre, 1894
- Larra outeniqua Arnold, 1923
- Larra polita (F. Smith, 1858)
  Larra polita luzonensis Rohwer, 1919
- Larra praedatrix (Strand, 1910)
- Larra princeps (F. Smith, 1851)
- Larra psilocera Kohl, 1884
- Larra pusilla Arnold, 1932
- Larra pygidialis Cameron, 1904
- Larra rufa Arnold, 1929
- Larra saussurei Kohl, 1892
- Larra similis (Mocsáry, 1892)
- Larra simillima (F. Smith, 1856)
- Larra sinensis (Mocsáry, 1892)
- Larra stangei Menke, 1992
- Larra tarsata (F. Smith, 1860)
- Larra tawitawiensis Tsuneki, 1976
- Larra transcaspica F. Morawitz, 1894
- Larra variipes de Saussure, 1892
- Larra vechti Sudheendrakumar and Narendran, 1985
- Larra zarudniana Gussakovskij, 1933
