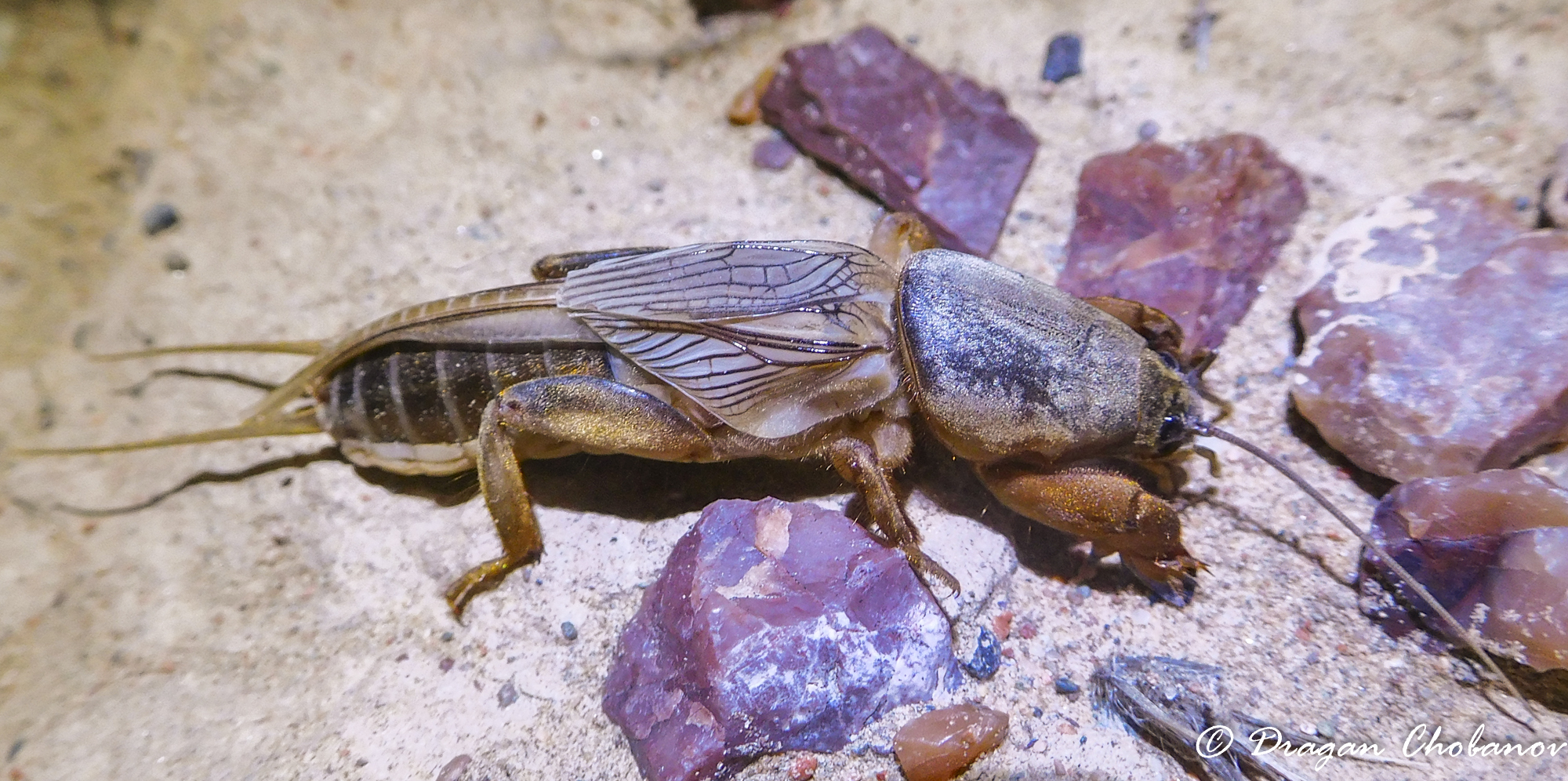

Scientific classification
- Domain: Eukaryota
- Kingdom: Animalia
- Phylum: Arthropoda
- Class: Insecta
- Order: Orthoptera
- Suborder: Ensifera
- Family: Gryllotalpidae
- Genus: Gryllotalpa
- Species: G. unispina

Binomial name
- Gryllotalpa unispina Saussure, 1874

Synonyms
- Gryllotalpa manschurei Shiraki, 1930; Curtilla unispina (Saussure, 1874)

= Gryllotalpa unispina =

Species of cricket-like animal

Gryllotalpa unispina is a species of mole cricket, in the G. gryllotalpa species group, found in Eastern Europe through to Manchuria. No subspecies are listed in the Catalogue of Life.
