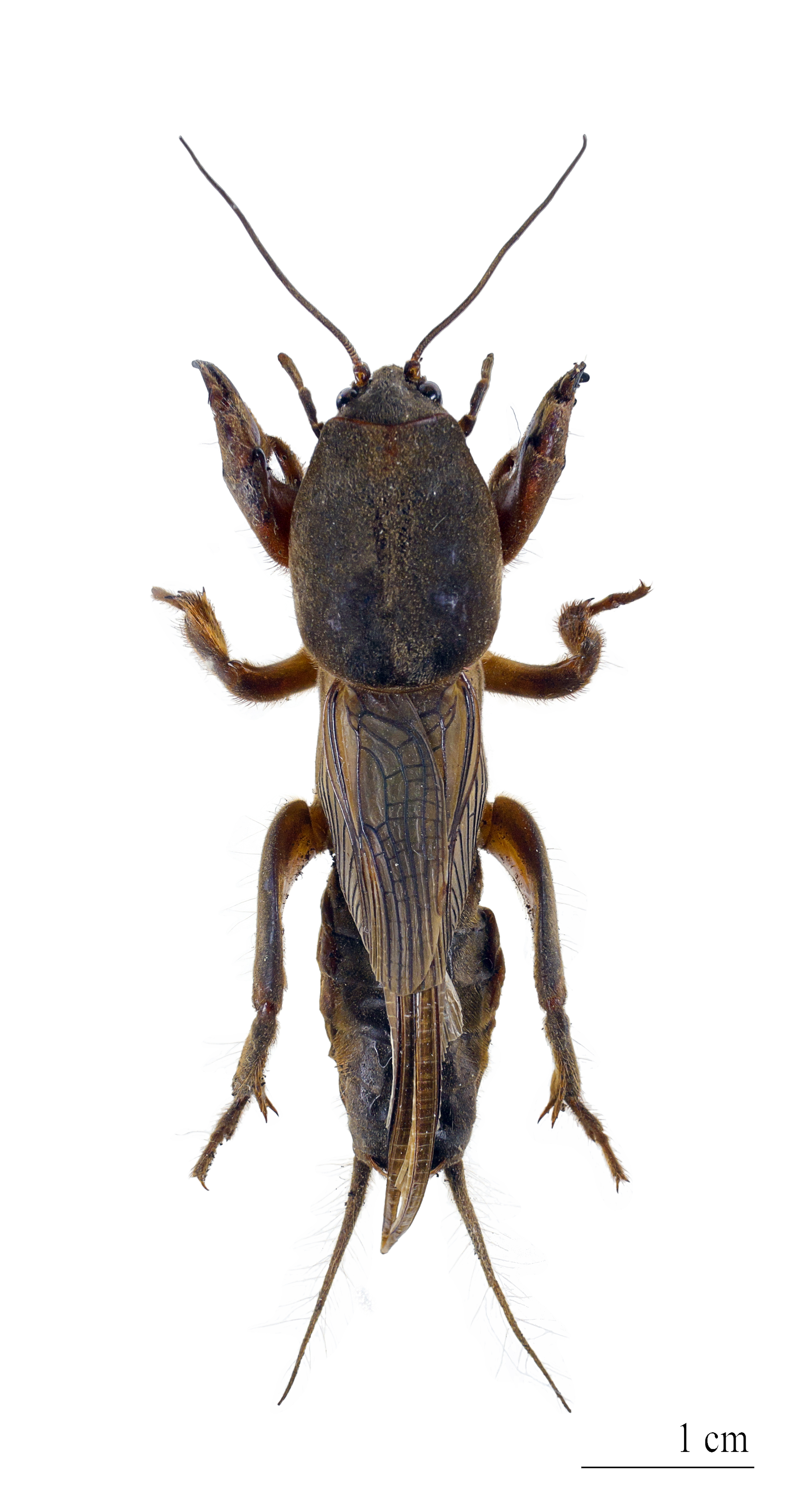
- Gryllotalpa gryllotalpa

Scientific classification
- Kingdom: Animalia
- Phylum: Arthropoda
- Clade: Pancrustacea
- Class: Insecta
- Order: Orthoptera
- Suborder: Ensifera
- Family: Gryllotalpidae
- Subfamily: Gryllotalpinae
- Tribe: Gryllotalpini; Leach, 1815
- Genus: Gryllotalpa; Latreille, 1802

Species
- see text

Synonyms
- Austrotalpa Mjöberg, 1913; Curtilla Oken, 1815

= Gryllotalpa =

Genus of cricket-like animals

Gryllotalpa is a genus of mole crickets that belongs to the subfamily Gryllotalpinae.

== Taxonomy ==
The genus was described in 1802 by Pierre André Latreille, a French zoologist who specializes in arthropods.

=== Species ===
The Orthoptera Species File lists a number species, including cryptic species groups (indicated with a * and often distinguished only by song patterns). They include:

- species group* Gryllotalpa africana Palisot de Beauvois, 1805 — Africa
- species group* Gryllotalpa australis Erichson, 1842 includes:
  - Gryllotalpa brachyptera Tindale, 1928 — Australia
- Gryllotalpa breviabdominis Ma & Zhang, 2011
- Gryllotalpa chiliensis Saussure, 1861
- Gryllotalpa chinensis Westwood, 1838
- Gryllotalpa choui Ma & Zhang, 2010
- Gryllotalpa cophta (Haan, 1844)
- Gryllotalpa cultriger Uhler, 1864 — Mexico
- Gryllotalpa cycloptera Ma & Zhang, 2011
- Gryllotalpa dentista Yang, 1995
- Gryllotalpa formosana Shiraki, 1930 — Taiwan
- Gryllotalpa fraser Tan & Kamaruddin, 2013
- Gryllotalpa fulvipes Saussure, 1877
- Gryllotalpa fusca Chopard, 1930
- Gryllotalpa gorkhana Ingrisch, 2006
- Gryllotalpa gracilis Chopard, 1930
- species group* Gryllotalpa gryllotalpa (Linnaeus, 1758) includes:
  - Gryllotalpa septemdecimchromosomica Ortiz, 1958
  - Gryllotalpa unispina Saussure, 1874
  - Gryllotalpa vineae Bennet-Clark, 1970
- Gryllotalpa henana Cai & Niu, 1998
- Gryllotalpa hirsuta Burmeister, 1838
- Gryllotalpa howensis Tindale, 1928
- Gryllotalpa insulana Chopard, 1954
- Gryllotalpa jinxiuensis You & Li, 1990
- Gryllotalpa krishnani Arun Prasanna, Anbalagan, Pandiarajan, Dinakaran & Krishnan, 2012
- Gryllotalpa mabiana Ma, Xu & Takeda, 2008
- Gryllotalpa madecassa (Chopard, 1920)
- Gryllotalpa major Saussure, 1874 — USA
- species group* Gryllotalpa monanka Otte & Alexander, 1983 — USA, Australia
- Gryllotalpa maroccana Baccetti, 1987
- Gryllotalpa minuta Burmeister, 1838
- †Gryllotalpa miocaenica Zeuner, 1931
- Gryllotalpa nitens Ingrisch, 2006
- Gryllotalpa nymphicus Tan, 2012
- Gryllotalpa obscura Chopard, 1966
- Gryllotalpa orientalis Burmeister, 1838 — Asia and Australia
- Gryllotalpa ornata Walker, 1869
- species group* Gryllotalpa oya Tindale, 1928 — Australia
- species group* Gryllotalpa parva Townsend, 1983 — Africa
- species group* Gryllotalpa pilosipes Tindale, 1928 — Australia
- species group* Gryllotalpa pluvialis (Mjöberg, 1913) — Australia
- Gryllotalpa permai Tan & Kamaruddin, 2016
- Gryllotalpa pygmaea Ingrisch, 1990
- Gryllotalpa wallace Tan, 2012
- Gryllotalpa wudangensis Li, Ma & Xu, 2007
- Gryllotalpa xinjiangica Gu & Miao, 2026 — northwestern China
