= Biotremology =

Elephants produce low-frequency rumbles which travel over long distances as seismic waves and are detected by sense organs in the elephant's feet.

Biotremology is the study of production, dispersion and reception of mechanical vibrations by organisms, and their effect on behavior. This involves neurophysiological and anatomical basis of vibration production and detection, and relation of vibrations to the medium they disperse through. Vibrations can represent either signals used in vibrational (seismic) communication or inadvertent cues used, for example, in locating prey (in some cases even both). In almost all known cases, they are transmitted as surface waves along the boundary of a medium, i.e. Rayleigh waves or bending waves. While most attention is directed towards the role of vibrations in animal behavior, plants actively respond to sounds and vibrations as well, so this subject is shared with plant bioacoustics. Other groups of organisms (such as nematodes) are also postulated to either actively produce or at least use vibrations to sense their environment, but those are currently far less studied.

Traditionally regarded part of bioacoustics, the discipline has recently begun to actively diverge on its own, because of the many peculiarities of the studied modality compared with sound. Vibrational communication has been recognized as evolutionarily older than sound and much more prevalent, at least among arthropods, although the two modalities are closely related and sometimes overlap. While many experimental approaches are shared between the two disciplines, scientists in the field of biotremology often use special equipment, such as laser vibrometers, for detecting faint vibrational emissions by animals and electromagnetic transducers in contact with the substrate for artificial playback experiments.

== History ==
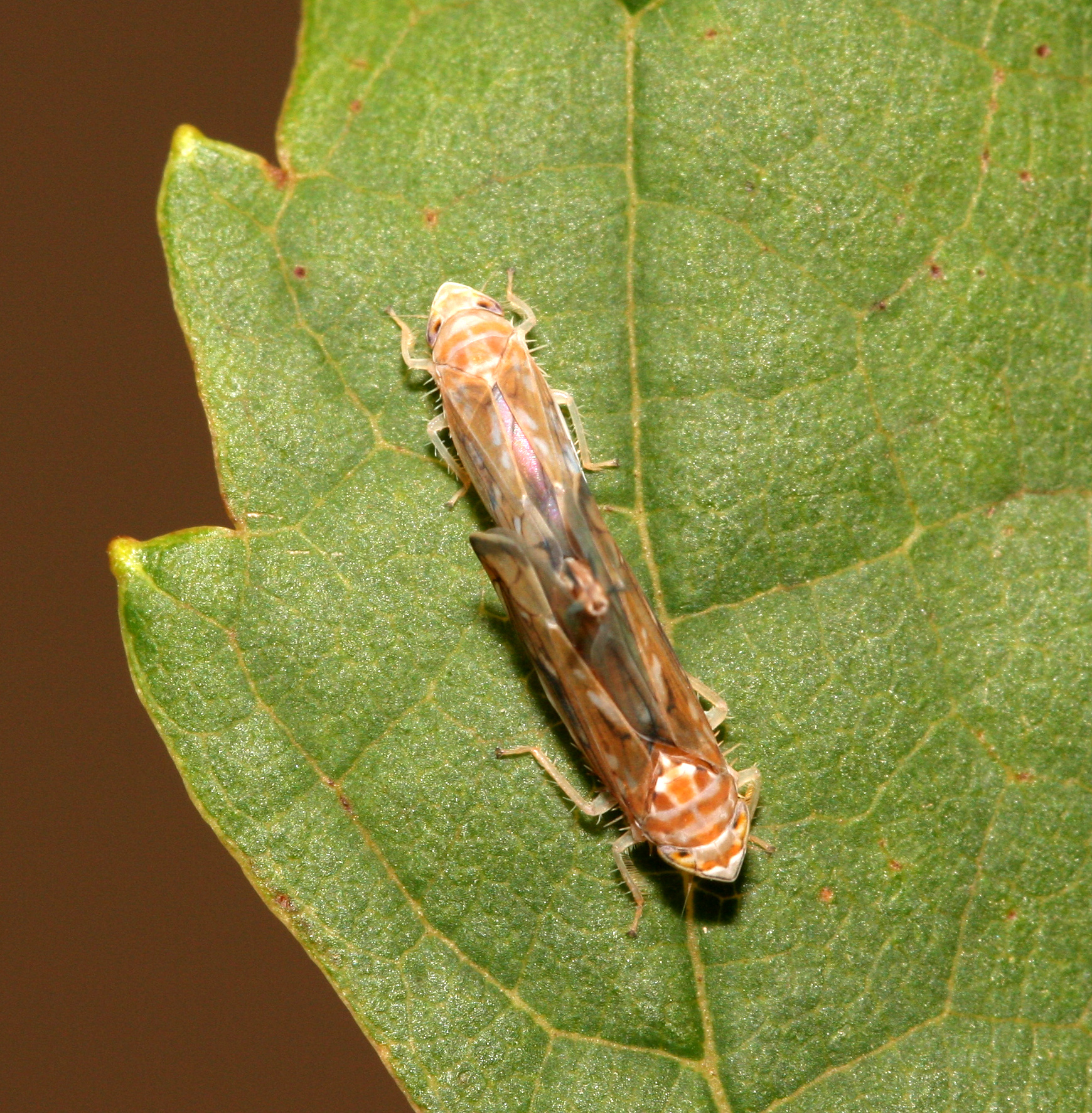
Leafhoppers are a group of insects known for using only vibrational signals during courtship. They also comprise numerous pests (the American grapevine leafhopper pictured), so biotremologists are developing alternative methods of pest control on this basis.

People have observed vibrational communication by animals for hundreds of years, although the idea that vibrations may convey information dates to the middle of the 20th century. Swedish entomologist Frej Ossiannilsson pioneered the field in 1949 by suggesting vibrations transmitted through plants play a role in insect communication. His work demonstrating this suggestion was not heeded by contemporaries because many zoologists believed that such small animals are physically incapable of conveying information through solid substrates. Only with the advent of accessible signal processing technology decades later did the work by other pioneering individuals and groups, such as the Slovenian zoologist Matija Gogala, establish the basis of biotremology. It remains a relatively understudied discipline, at least compared to bioacoustics, partly because most of animal-produced signals are undetectable to non-augmented human senses.

Nevertheless, several instances of practical utilization of the knowledge obtained are already in use or are being actively developed, such as mating disruption using vibrational noise for non-chemical pest control and detection of concealed arthropod pests (such as wood-boring insects).
