= Gryllotalpa major =

- Adult male

Conservation status
- Data Deficient (IUCN 2.3)

- Vulnerable (NatureServe)

Scientific classification
- Kingdom: Animalia
- Phylum: Arthropoda
- Clade: Pancrustacea
- Class: Insecta
- Order: Orthoptera
- Suborder: Ensifera
- Family: Gryllotalpidae
- Genus: Gryllotalpa
- Species: G. major

Binomial name
- Gryllotalpa major Saussure, 1874

Synonyms
- Neocurtilla major (Saussure, 1874)

Species of cricket-like animal

Gryllotalpa major, also known as the prairie mole cricket, is endemic to the United States and is the largest cricket in North America. Its natural habitat is temperate grassland and it belongs to the family Gryllotalpidae. It is threatened by habitat loss, and is currently only found in Oklahoma, Kansas, Missouri, Nebraska and Arkansas. Males of this species produce sounds by rubbing their fore wings together. They sing from special burrows they construct in the prairie soil to attract females for mating, and they can be heard at distances up to 400 m from the burrow. Males aggregate their acoustic burrows in a lek arena and are very sensitive to vibrations carried through the ground. Males communicate with neighboring males through vibrational signals, and the songs they project to flying females are harmonic chirps, rather than the trills produced by most mole crickets.

== Physiology ==
The species is the largest of the North American crickets, measuring up to 5 cm long, weighing up to 2.6 g, and is typically brown to reddish-brown in color. Like other mole crickets (Gryllotalpidae), G. major has a bullet-shaped, heavy pronotum and large robust fore limbs used for digging complex burrows. Like other Orthoptera males, they have modified fore wings with a stridulatory apparatus which they use in conjunction with acoustic burrows to perform an acoustic sexual advertisement call to attract females during their brief mating season beginning in late spring.

Females of G. major have similar stridulatory files as males, though smaller and weaker, and they are in fact capable of producing sound, though it seems the sound serves no function in other species sound production by females is linked to aggression and defense. In a study on the hearing sensitivity of G. major, researchers found that they have hearing sensitivities from 2 kHz to an ultrasonic range at 25 kHz.

== Distribution and habitat ==
G. major is native to tall grass prairie ecosystems and occupies a small range in the southcentral United States, found only in Kansas, Missouri, Arkansas, and Oklahoma. Prescribed burning is common throughout the prairie habitat of G. major and usually occurs during March and April, at the beginning of the reproductive season of the cricket. Howard and Hill looked to the effect of these burning on the distribution of G. major and found that recent burned land can be beneficial to the cricket and provide some advantages to mating behaviours. G. major has been observed calling on recently burned sites within 24 hours of the site being burned. The warmer soil as a result of the fire is thought to have metabolic advantages for the cricket, allowing them to increase their chirp frequency, and overall the burned land allows their song to travel more efficiently, increasing to attraction of females to the area. The belowground grass biomass on which the cricket feeds remains intact after a burn, and no evidence of direct mortality of the cricket has been documented.

The grass height of the prairie land has a marked effect on the male burrows in a lek. They found that as grass height increased, the spacing between each burrow also increased, as well as an increase in the angle of opening to the burrow. This behavior may have evolved as response to the dynamic disturbances of tallgrass prairie ecosystems.

== Mating behaviour ==
The males of G. major build an acoustic burrow in prairie soil arranged in a lek-like arena and perform an acoustic sexual advertisement call for the female of the species by singing from these calling chambers while the female flies overhead, making her choice. The call males produce is a loud, long-range, airborne song consisting of a pattern of long chirps with a frequency of 2 kHz and up to five harmonics, and these songs can be heard up to 400 m away. The female flies at a height of 1.5-5.0 m above the lek, assessing each individual male presumably based on the attractiveness of the male call and the position of the male within the lek arena. Females can detect male signals from up to 76 m away and usually arrive within 20 minutes. Once the female selects an appropriate male, she drops down, landing 3–5 m from the chosen male's burrow and uses phonotaxis to find her way; once there, she enters the burrow, mates with the male, and goes on her way. Though the female is expected to choose the male closer to the arena due to the decrease predation risk among the males, the female choice of males appears to be randomly spread across the lek with the more attractive males being located further from the center and farther from the nearest calling neighbor. The preference from more isolated males could be a way of maximizing fitness, as these males are able to maintain costly display territory with increased predation risk.

Research into the mating behaviour of G. major found they fit the three main criteria of a classical lek system. Males serve no role in parental care, other than fertilizing female eggs, they die soon after mating season, and do not tend to the eggs or young in any way. Males create lek-like arenas of evenly positioned burrows, and the females are free to fly over to make their choice without male influence, for example sequestering resources or forcing copulation upon the female. So, G. major fits within a slightly modified definition of a lek system, modified only to adjust for an insect species and broaden the typical umbrella classification.

While singing males of G. major produce vibrations which travel through the soil, influencing neighboring males which are able to distinguish these ground vibrations from other background vibrations. These singing vibrations can travel up to 3 m in the soil depending on conditions, and the energy ranges from 30 to 300 Hz. They also found that males do not alter their calls in response to the airborne calls of other males, but rather some do respond to the ground vibrations of others and may abandon and relocate their burrows to a more optimal position. The call of G. major is unique among crickets as they use a chirp rather than a trill to attract females. This chirp was analyzed and found that certain aspects of the chirp can be correlated to the morphology of the individual cricket. Overall, longer males produced a lower-frequency call that contained more syllables per chirp, though these males did not necessarily produce a louder call.

Within the lekking arena, males of G. major are in close proximity to each other and are thought to exhibit some influence on neighboring males. While males do sound louder on nights when more males are calling, individual males did not increase their maximum call volume with increased competition from other males, nor did they increase their volume due to the availability of female. No correlation was found in volume and the distance to an individual males nearest neighbor, nor a correlation with the density of the population. Males had a strong correlation between the temperature of the soil and their chirp rate due to an increase in metabolic energy, and also a correlation was found between the number of harmonics produced by a male and the distance to that male's closest neighbor. Individual calling males are influenced more by their nearest one or two closest neighbors than by the group as a whole.

== Phylogeny ==
A study into the phylogenetic relationship of Gryllotalpidae cricket grouped G. major in a group with Gryllotalpa devia, Gryllotalpa pilosopes, and Gryllotalpa inermis due to the dorsal hind tibiae lacking subapical spurs.

== Species status ==
In the late 1980s, G. major was recommended to be placed under protected status as a threatened species, but a lack of ecological information has stalled protection efforts. The IUCN Red List calls the species data deficient, as more data on the habitat and effects of decreased tallgrass prairie land on the cricket's population are needed. NatureServe has G. major listed as G3 – vulnerable due to scattered populations and habitat loss.
