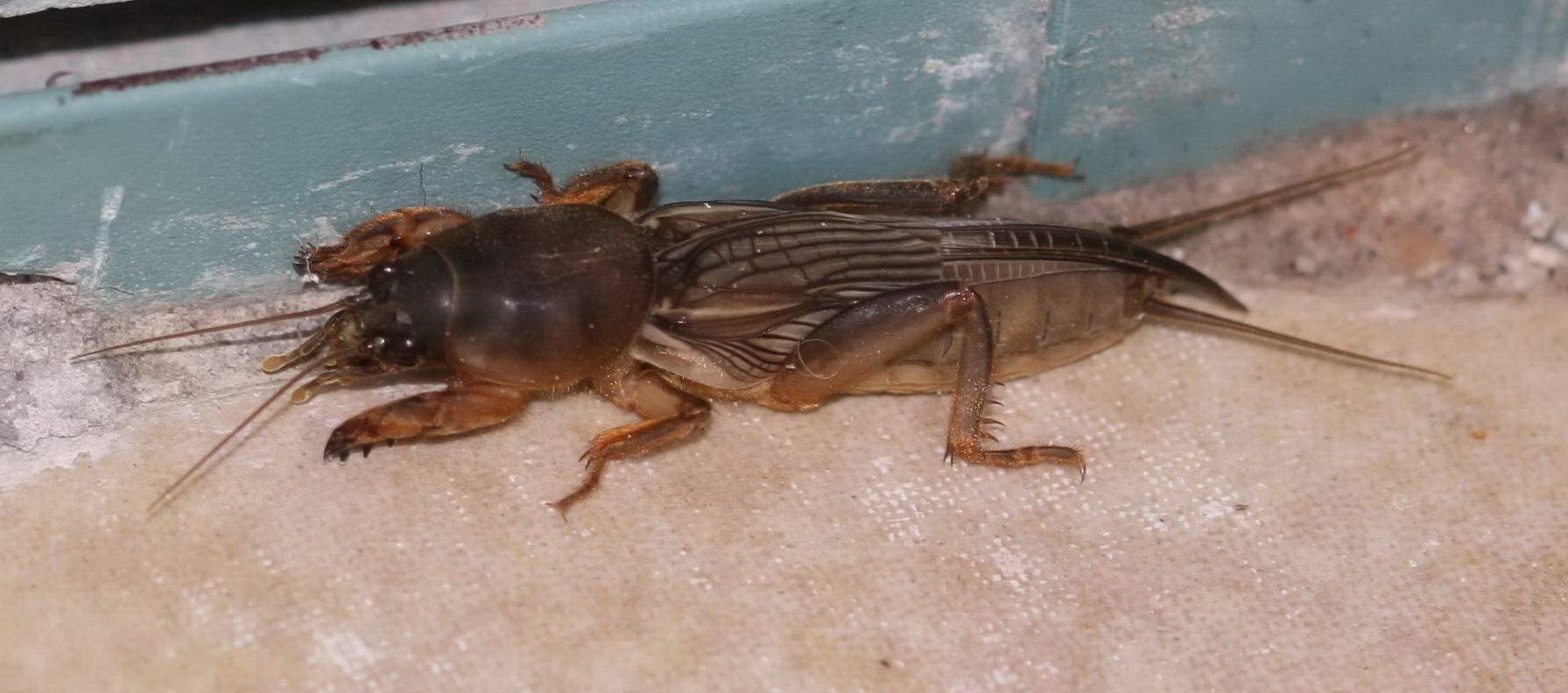

Scientific classification
- Kingdom: Animalia
- Phylum: Arthropoda
- Class: Insecta
- Order: Orthoptera
- Suborder: Ensifera
- Family: Gryllotalpidae
- Genus: Gryllotalpa
- Species: G. orientalis

Binomial name
- Gryllotalpa orientalis Burmeister, 1838

Synonyms
- Gryllotalpa fossor Scudder, 1869

= Gryllotalpa orientalis =

Species of cricket-like animal

Gryllotalpa orientalis is a species of mole cricket in the family Gryllotalpidae, commonly known as the oriental mole cricket. It is found in much of Asia and Australasia. At one time, this species was misidentified as G. africana and thought to have a widespread distribution in both Africa and Asia, but in the 1980s, G. orientalis was recognised as a separate species. It is a polyphagous pest, damaging crops by gnawing their roots.

== Morphology and biology ==
This mole cricket is plump, yellowish-brown, and paler beneath, and about 20 mm long. It has short filiform antennae, fore legs designed for digging, and a large, oblong pronotum. The wings project slightly from beneath the fore wings. After mating underground, the female builds a nesting chamber deep in the soil and lays about 200 oval eggs that hatch after 10 days. The nymphs remain in their nest for the first 2-3 weeks, guarded by the female. A newly hatched nymph has a blueish-white prothorax and legs. Later instars are grayish-black with white markings, and the last nymphal stage is similar to the adult and exhibits short wing pads. The whole lifecycle lasts for 1-3 years depending on the climatic conditions. The adults and late-instar nymphs spend the winter underground at a depth around 1 m.

== Distribution ==
The oriental mole cricket is found in Russia and other parts of the former USSR, China, Japan, Taiwan, India, Indonesia, the Philippines, and Hawaii, where it seems to have arrived from Asia before 1896.

== Ecology ==
The oriental mole cricket lives underground in damp soil, digging a network of passages. Its natural habitat include damp, rich soils such as flood plains and the banks of streams and ponds, as well as arable land and gardens. The burrow has vertical and horizontal passages and may be complex in structure, with different parts being used for different purposes. The mole cricket feeds on the roots, tubers, and rhizomes of plants, and also on insects, earthworms, and other invertebrates. It comes to the surface and undertakes flight in the evenings and at night, and is attracted to light sources. A mass emergence after wintering may take place when the temperature rises to 12-15°C. Besides birds and insectivorous mammals, its natural enemies include ants, which feed on the eggs, beetles, which eat the larvae, nematodes, and mites. Fungal diseases may be devastating during winters with sudden rises of temperature and thaws.

== Economic significance ==
In Hawaii, sugarcane crops have been attacked by this cricket, and its tunneling activities have caused damage to the banks of irrigation ditches. In Asia, the cricket gnaws roots and tubers and causes damage to wheat, barley, oats, rice, maize, beans, vegetable crops, potatoes, and sugar beets. Measures to control the pest include deep ploughing, trapping, soil fumigation, poison baits, and the application of insecticides. In Australia, damage is sometimes done to rice crops in raised nursery beds or in upland conditions. In wetland rice, the crickets can be seen swimming between plants.

== Biological control in Hawaii ==
Larra is a genus of wasps in the family Crabronidae, the members of which are parasitoids of mole crickets. After several unsuccessful attempts to introduce these wasps to Hawaii, in 1925, Larra polita from the Philippines was successfully introduced and succeeded in establishing itself. Little comment has been given since 1930 on the damage being done by the oriental mole cricket in Hawaii, and this may be due to the presence of these wasps.
