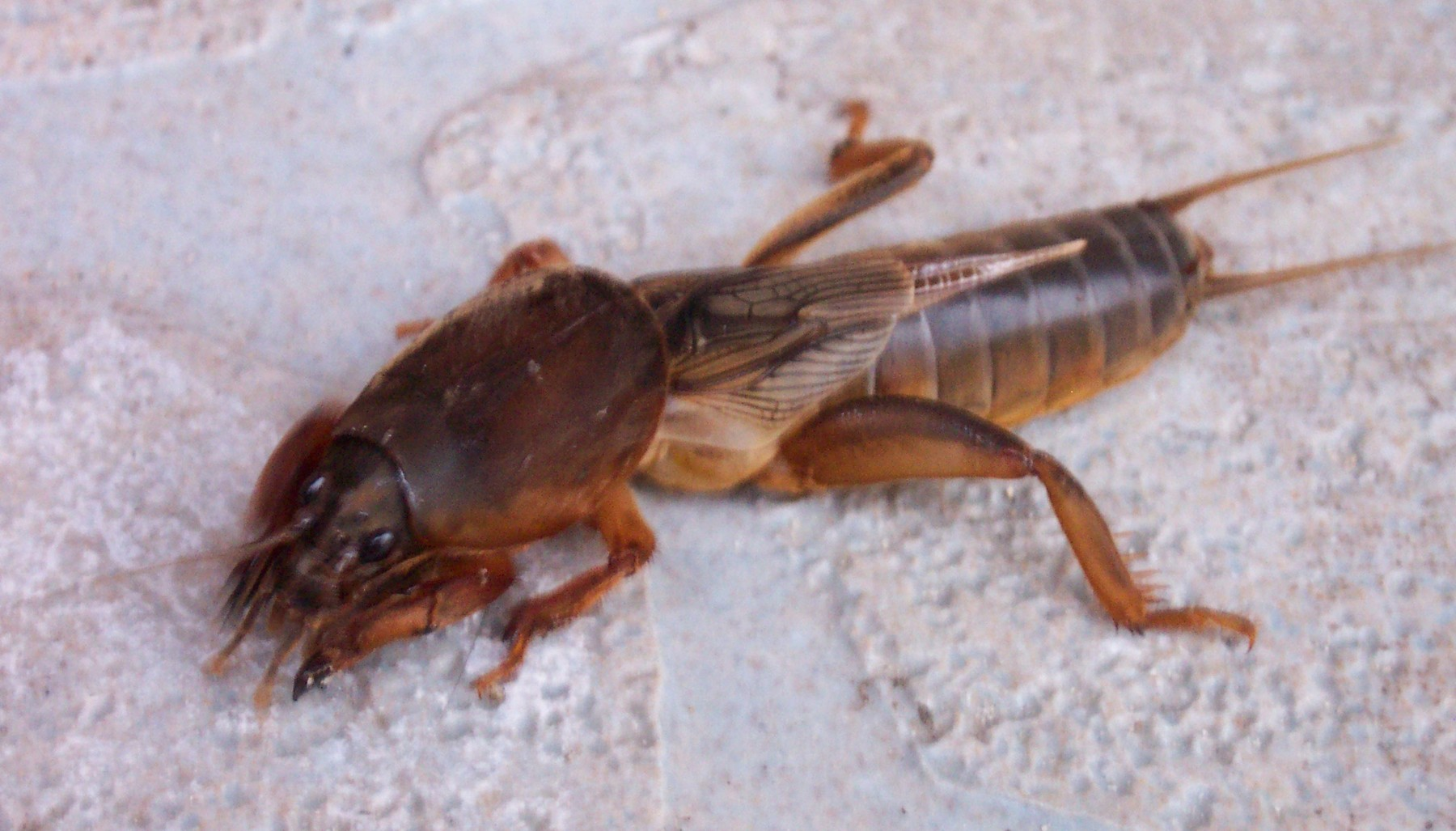

Conservation status
- Least Concern (IUCN 3.1)(Europe)

Scientific classification
- Kingdom: Animalia
- Phylum: Arthropoda
- Clade: Pancrustacea
- Class: Insecta
- Order: Orthoptera
- Suborder: Ensifera
- Family: Gryllotalpidae
- Genus: Gryllotalpa
- Species: G. gryllotalpa

Binomial name
- Gryllotalpa gryllotalpa (Linnaeus, 1758)

Synonyms
- Acheta gryllotalpa (Linnaeus 1758); Gryllotalpa vulgaris Latreille 1804; Gryllus gryllotalpa Linnaeus 1758; Gryllus talpa Olivier 1791

= Gryllotalpa gryllotalpa =

Species of cricket-like animal

Close-Up of a Gryllotalpa gryllotalpa

Gryllotalpa gryllotalpa, commonly known as the European mole cricket, is widespread in Europe and has been introduced to the eastern United States. Its scientific name is derived from the Latin 'gryllus' (cricket); and 'talpa' (mole), because of the fine dense fur which covers it and its subterranean habits, and because of the mole-like forelegs adapted for digging, it's a good example of convergent evolution.

== Description ==
The body length is about 50 millimetres (2.0 in) in males and 70 millimetres (2.8 in) in females. The cricket is dark brown with a silky shimmer and yellowish underside and is covered with fine velvety hairs. The forelegs are powerful and modified for digging. The elytra are half the length of the abdomen and the wings are transparent and netted with veins. They are folded into pleats and seldom used as the cricket normally remains below the ground. The males can be distinguished from the females by the open vein area in the forewing known as the 'harp' while the females lack the external ovipositor that is possessed by other crickets.

== Range and habitat ==
This mole cricket occurs throughout much of the Western Palaearctic, but is replaced by similar species in the south and east, and becomes rare or absent towards the north. It is thought to be possibly extirpated from Ireland, given only one record from 1920. Favoured habitats include damp rich soils, flood plains, reservoir edges, irrigated and well-fertilized fields and vegetable gardens. The family Gryllotalpidae includes several similar species.

== Biology ==
The female cricket lays 100 to 350 eggs in an underground chamber in the spring. They hatch ten to twenty days later and she guards them for another two to three weeks. The nymphs moult six times and take from one to three years to reach maturity. Adults and nymphs live underground throughout the year in extensive tunnel systems that may reach a depth of over a metre in the winter. They are omnivorous, feeding on roots, tubers and rhizomes and a range of soil invertebrates. They often leave neat circular holes in tuberous plants. The males occasionally produce a soft, 'churring' song from within a specially constructed chamber in the burrow system. This acts to amplify the song which is believed to be used for attracting females. The sounds are typically produced on warm mild evenings in early spring and they are similar to the song of the European Nightjar (Caprimulgus europeaeus). Natural enemies include rooks, starlings and other birds, shrews, moles, ants, ground beetles, nematodes and mites. During winters interrupted by thaws, fungal diseases may cause mass deaths.

== Economic significance ==
This cricket feeds on a wide range of crops and disturbs the soil with its burrowing activities. In countries where it is abundant it is considered a pest as it damages cereals, legumes, perennial grasses, potatoes, vegetable crops, beet, sunflower, tobacco, hemp, flax and strawberry. It also is troublesome in nurseries where young plants may be killed, and damages the roots of vines, fruit and other trees. Control measures may include deep autumn plowing, treatments of the soil between rows of crops, trapping during the winter, pesticides, poison baits and soil fumigation.

== Conservation ==
=== Status (UK) ===
Although relatively common in many parts of mainland Europe, in the United Kingdom G. gryllotalpa is considered endangered as there have been only four confirmed sightings between 1970 and 2001. It used to occur in 33 vice-counties, mainly across Southern England but also in South Wales, western Scotland and Northern Ireland. Its range has contracted although there has been a confirmed sighting in the Findhorn Hinterlands, Scotland. There is an action plan that aims to maintain any surviving colonies, establish a captive breeding programme and establish self-sustaining colonies throughout its former range.

In 2014, a colony of mole crickets was found persisting in the New Forest.

== Cryptic species ==
Gryllotalpa gryllotalpa stridulation
Song of Gryllotalpa gryllotalpa

Sound of Gryllotalpa gryllotalpa
Field recording in the Netherlands

Stridulating Gryllotalpa gryllotalpa
Field recording in Germany, together with different amphibians

Stridulating Gryllotalpa vineae
Lab. recording?

It is now understood that G. gryllotalpa is a species group, that includes a number of cryptic species which can be distinguished most readily by their song patterns. The Orthoptera Species File lists:

1. Gryllotalpa cossyrensis Baccetti & Capra, 1978
2. Gryllotalpa gryllotalpa (Linnaeus, 1758)
3. Gryllotalpa isfahan Ingrisch, Nikouei & Hatami, 2006
4. Gryllotalpa krimbasi Baccetti, 1992
5. Gryllotalpa marismortui Broza, Blondheim & Nevo, 1998
6. Gryllotalpa octodecim Baccetti & Capra, 1978
7. Gryllotalpa quindecim Baccetti & Capra, 1978
8. Gryllotalpa sedecim Baccetti & Capra, 1978
9. Gryllotalpa septemdecimchromosomica Ortiz, 1958
10. Gryllotalpa stepposa Zhantiev, 1991
11. Gryllotalpa tali Broza, Blondheim & Nevo, 1998
12. Gryllotalpa unispina Saussure, 1874
13. Gryllotalpa viginti Baccetti & Capra, 1978
14. Gryllotalpa vigintiunum Baccetti, 1991
15. Gryllotalpa vineae Bennet-Clark, 1970
