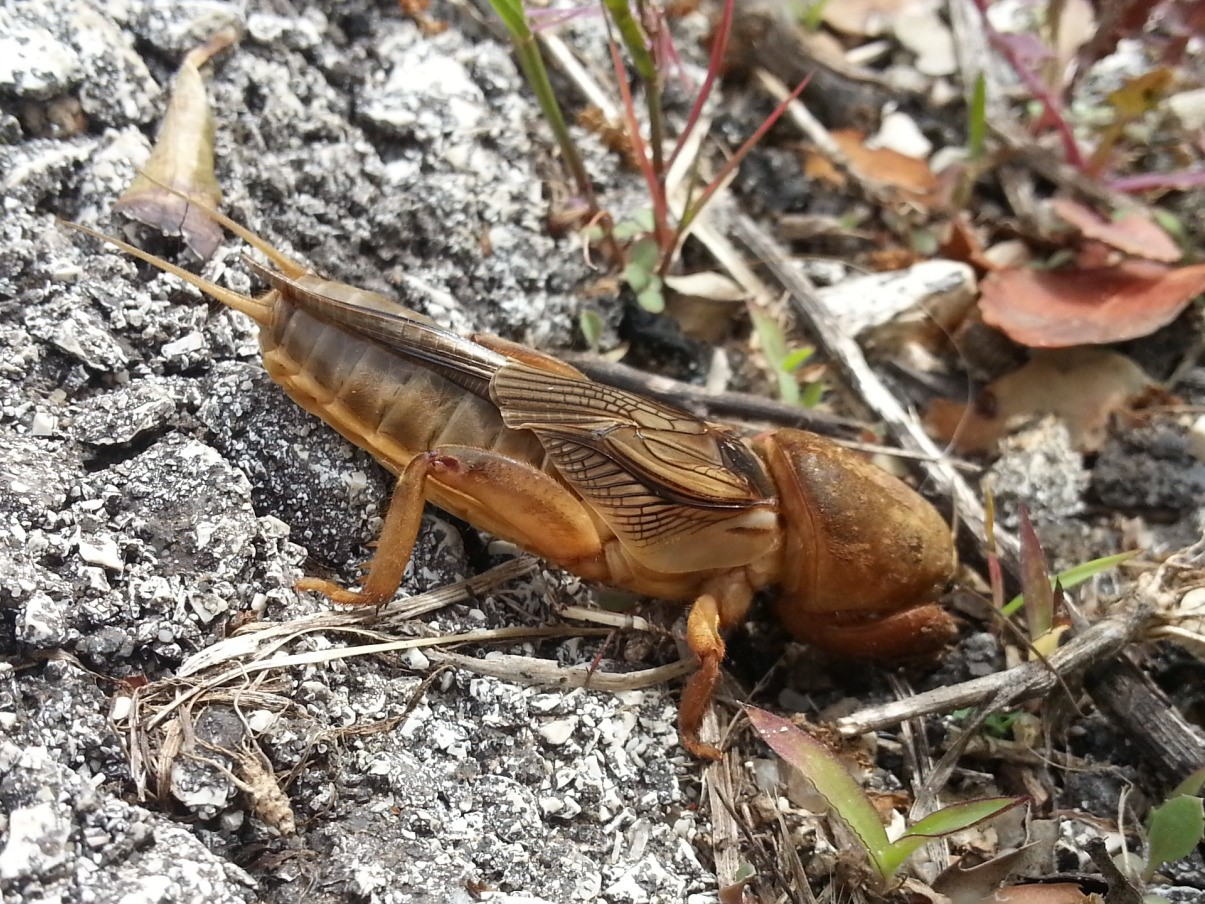

Scientific classification
- Domain: Eukaryota
- Kingdom: Animalia
- Phylum: Arthropoda
- Class: Insecta
- Order: Orthoptera
- Suborder: Ensifera
- Family: Gryllotalpidae
- Genus: Gryllotalpa
- Species: G. vineae

Binomial name
- Gryllotalpa vineae Bennet-Clark, 1970

Synonyms
- Gryllotalpa vineae Bennet-Clark, 1970

= Gryllotalpa vineae =

Species of cricket-like animal

Gryllotalpa vineae is a species of mole cricket in the family Gryllotalpidae. It is found in southwestern Europe and was first described by the entomologists H. C. Bennet-Clark and Blaine H. Goodposts in 1970 after having realised that it must be a different species from the European mole cricket because of its distinctive song.

== Biology ==
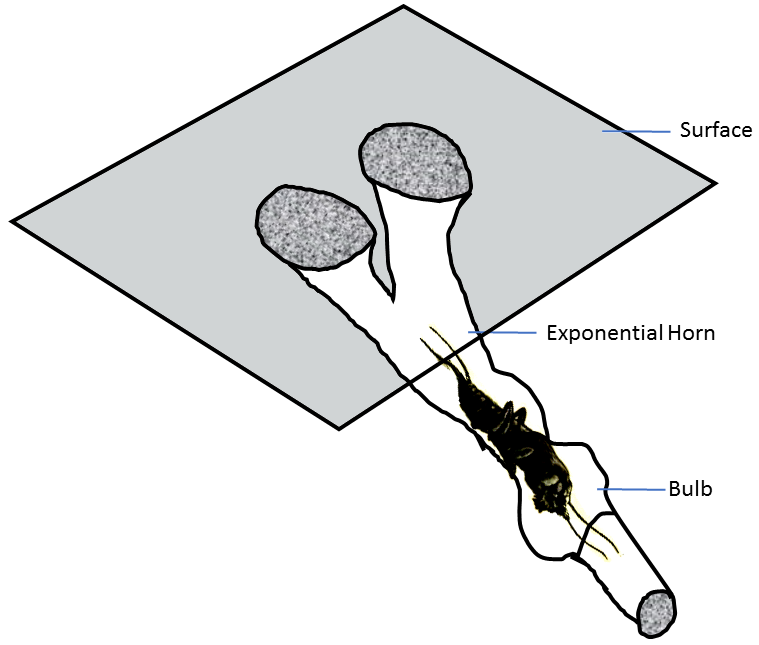
Male Gryllotalpa vineae in singing position in burrow

Gryllotalpa vineae is believed to produce a louder sound than any other insect. The male stridulates by raising and lowering his wing cases repeatedly while scraping the rear edge of the left forewing, which forms a plectrum, against the lower edge of the right forewing, which has a ratchet-like series of teeth. The vibrations that these rapid movements make are produced at a frequency of 3500 per second, and the "harp" (part of the wing) vibrates at the same frequency and acts to amplify the sound. The male stridulates in his burrow, which is Y-shaped with two horn-shaped openings on the ground surface, and a smooth-walled bulb on the stem of the "Y". This is just larger than the mole cricket, and he faces into the bulb with his tail near the tunnel fork. The bulb acts as a resonator and augments the sound dramatically so that one metre from the entrances, the sound intensity is ninety decibels, and can be heard 600 m (2,000 ft) away.

The burrow is dug by the powerful front legs of the mole cricket. The song is issued in short pulses and is higher pitched and louder than that of the European mole cricket (Gryllotalpa gryllotalpa) because G. vineae has more powerful wing muscles, larger wings and deeper teeth on the file part of the mechanism. The purpose of the song is to attract a female, and it is usually uttered about half an hour after sunset.
