= Bioacoustics =

Study of sound relating to biology

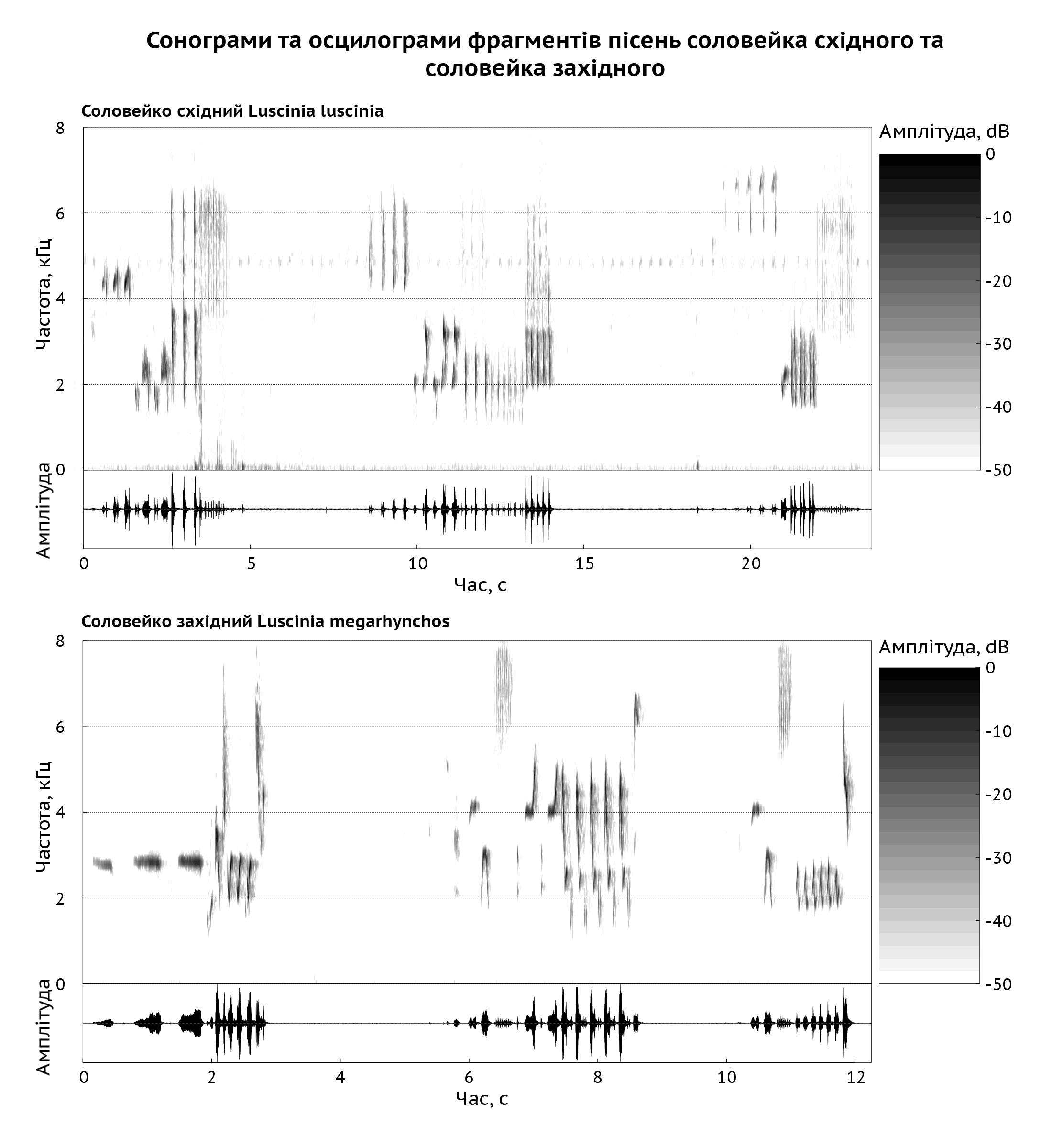
Spectrograms of Thrush nightingale (Luscinia luscinia) and Common nightingale (Luscinia megarhynchos) singing help to reliably distinguish these two species by voice.

Bioacoustics is a cross-disciplinary science that combines biology and acoustics. Usually, it refers to the investigation of sound production, dispersion and reception in animals (including humans). This involves neurophysiological and anatomical basis of sound production and detection, and relation of acoustic signals to the medium they disperse through. The findings provide clues about the evolution of acoustic mechanisms, and from that, the evolution of animals that employ them.

In underwater acoustics and fisheries acoustics, the term is also used to mean the effect of plants and animals on sound propagated underwater, usually in reference to the use of sonar technology for biomass estimation. The study of substrate-borne vibrations used by animals is considered by some a distinct field called biotremology.

== History ==
For a long time, humans have employed animal sounds to recognise and find them. Bioacoustics as a scientific discipline was established by the Slovene biologist Ivan Regen who began systematically to study insect sounds. In 1925, he used a special stridulatory device to play in a duet with an insect. Later, he put a male cricket behind a microphone and female crickets in front of a loudspeaker. The females were not moving towards the male but towards the loudspeaker. Regen's most important contribution to the field apart from realization that insects also detect airborne sounds was the discovery of tympanal organ's function.

Relatively crude electro-mechanical devices available at the time (such as phonographs) allowed only for crude appraisal of signal properties. More accurate measurements were made possible in the second half of the 20th century by advances in electronics and utilization of devices such as oscilloscopes and digital recorders.

The most recent advances in bioacoustics concern the relationships among the animals and their acoustic environment and the impact of anthropogenic noise. Bioacoustic techniques have recently been proposed as a non-destructive method for estimating biodiversity of an area.

== Importance ==
In the terrestrial environment, animals often use light for sensing distance, since light propagates well through air. Underwater, however, sunlight only reaches to depths of tens of meters, while sound propagates readily through water and across considerable distances. Many marine animals can see well, but use hearing for communication, and sensing distance and location. Gauging the relative importance of audition versus vision in animals can be performed by comparing the number of auditory and optic nerves.

Since the 1950s to 1960s, studies on dolphin echolocation behavior using high frequency click sounds revealed that many different marine mammal species make sounds, which can be used to detect and identify species under water. Much research in bioacoustics has been funded by naval research organizations, as biological sound sources can interfere with military uses underwater.

== Methods ==
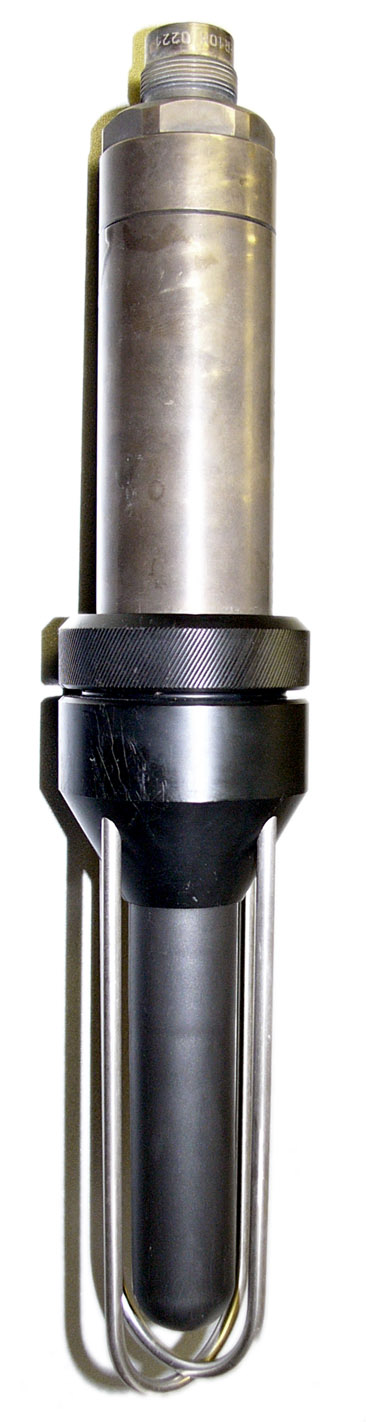
Hydrophone

Listening is still one of the main methods used in bioacoustical research. Little is known about neurophysiological processes that play a role in production, detection and interpretation of sounds in animals, so animal behaviour and the signals themselves are used for gaining insight into these processes.

Bioacoustics has also helped to pave the way for new emerging methods such as ecoacoustics (or acoustic ecology), an interdisciplinary field of research that studies the sounds produced by ecosystems, including biological, geophysical and anthropogenic sources. It examines how these sounds interact with the environment, providing insights into biodiversity, habitat health and ecological processes. By analysing soundscapes, ecoacoustics helps monitor environmental changes, assess conservation efforts and detect human impacts on natural systems.

=== Acoustic signals ===
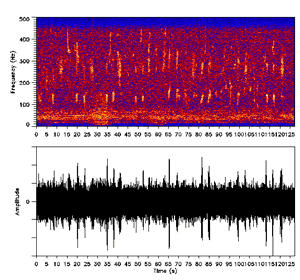
Spectrogram (above) and oscillogram (below) of the humpback whale's calls

An experienced observer can use animal sounds to recognize a "singing" animal species, its location and condition in nature. Investigation of animal sounds also includes signal recording with electronic recording equipment. Due to the wide range of signal properties and media they propagate through, specialized equipment may be required instead of the usual microphone, such as a hydrophone (for underwater sounds), detectors of ultrasound (very high-frequency sounds) or infrasound (very low-frequency sounds), or a laser vibrometer (substrate-borne vibrational signals). Computers are used for storing and analysis of recorded sounds. Specialized sound-editing software is used for describing and sorting signals according to their intensity, frequency, duration and other parameters.

Animal sound collections, managed by museums of natural history and other institutions, are an important tool for systematic investigation of signals. Many effective automated methods involving signal processing, data mining, machine learning and artificial intelligence techniques have been developed to detect and classify the bioacoustic signals.

=== Sound production, detection, and use in animals ===
Scientists in the field of bioacoustics are interested in anatomy and neurophysiology of organs involved in sound production and detection, including their shape, muscle action, and activity of neuronal networks involved. Of special interest is coding of signals with action potentials in the latter.

But since the methods used for neurophysiological research are still fairly complex and understanding of relevant processes is incomplete, more trivial methods are also used. Especially useful is observation of behavioural responses to acoustic signals. One such response is phonotaxis – directional movement towards the signal source. By observing response to well defined signals in a controlled environment, we can gain insight into signal function, sensitivity of the hearing apparatus, noise filtering capability, etc.

=== Biomass estimation ===
Biomass estimation is a method of detecting and quantifying fish and other marine organisms using sonar technology. As the sound pulse travels through water it encounters objects that are of different density than the surrounding medium, such as fish, that reflect sound back toward the sound source. These echoes provide information on fish size, location, and abundance. The basic components of the scientific echo sounder hardware function is to transmit the sound, receive, filter and amplify, record, and analyze the echoes. While there are many manufacturers of commercially available "fish-finders," quantitative analysis requires that measurements be made with calibrated echo sounder equipment, having high signal-to-noise ratios.

=== AI detection ===
Perch is a pre-trained bioacoustic model that provides both accurate species classification for thousands of taxa and high-quality vector embeddings for transfer learning. Trained on a dataset spanning over 14,500 species including mammals and amphibians, it achieves state-of-the-art performance even in underwater environments like coral reefs, where it had almost no training data.

== Animal sounds ==
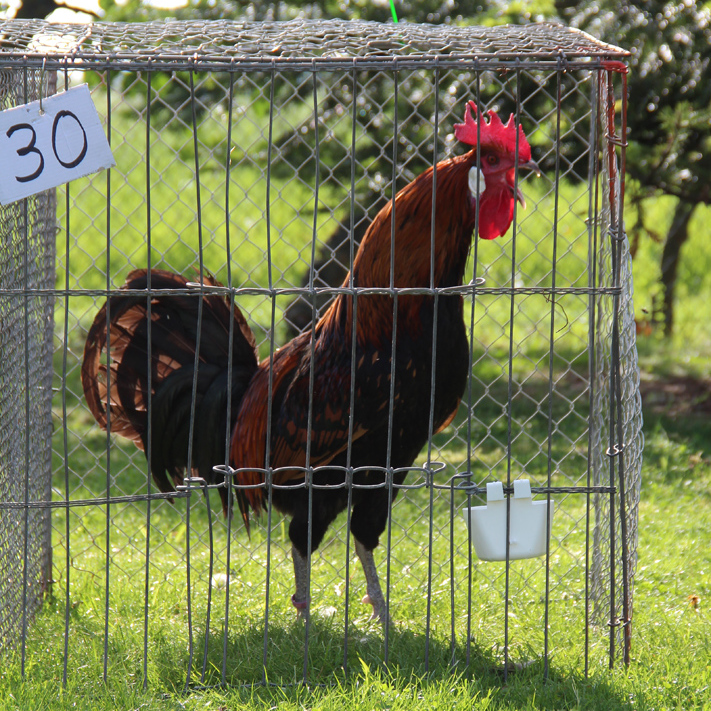
Bergische Crower crowing

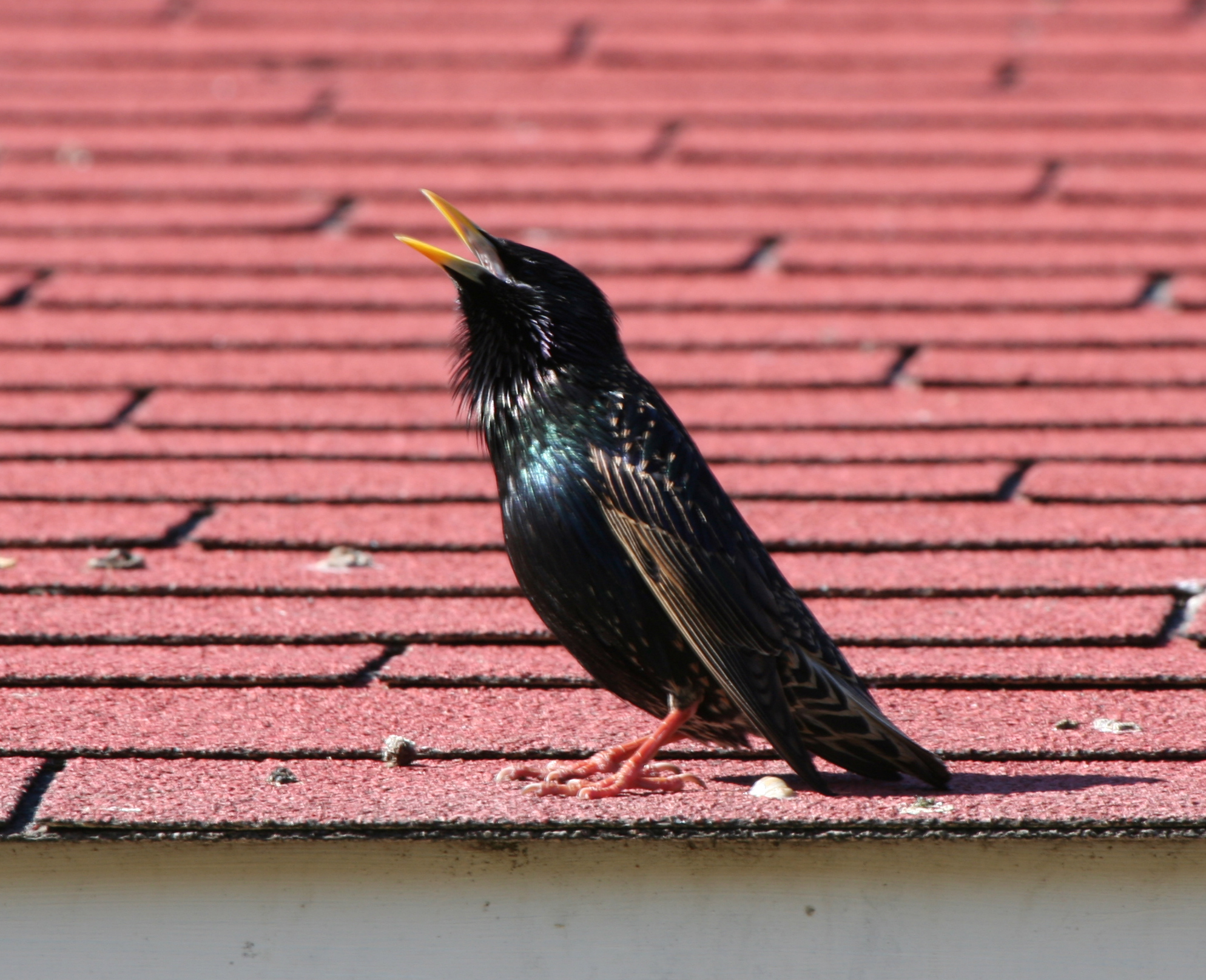
European starling singing

Sounds used by animals that fall within the scope of bioacoustics include a wide range of frequencies and media, and are often not "sound" in the narrow sense of the word (i.e. compression waves that propagate through air and are detectable by the human ear). Katydid crickets, for example, communicate by sounds with frequencies higher than 100 kHz, far into the ultrasound range. Lower, but still in ultrasound, are sounds used by bats for echolocation. A segmented marine worm Leocratides kimuraorum produces one of the loudest popping sounds in the ocean at 157 dB, frequencies 1–100 kHz, similar to the snapping shrimps. On the other side of the frequency spectrum are low frequency-vibrations, often not detected by hearing organs, but with other, less specialized sense organs. The examples include ground vibrations produced by elephants whose principal frequency component is around 15 Hz, and low- to medium-frequency substrate-borne vibrations used by most insect orders. Many animal sounds, however, do fall within the frequency range detectable by a human ear, between 20 and 20,000 Hz. Mechanisms for sound production and detection are just as diverse as the signals themselves.

== Plant sounds ==
In a series of scientific journal articles published between 2013 and 2016, Monica Gagliano of the University of Western Australia extended the science to include plant bioacoustics.

== See also ==
- Acoustic ecology
- Acoustical oceanography
- Animal communication
- Animal language
- Anthropophony
- Biomusic
- Biophony
- Diffusion (acoustics)
- Field recording
- Frog hearing and communication
- List of animal sounds
- List of Bioacoustics Software
- Music therapy
- Natural sounds
- Soundscape ecology
- Underwater acoustics
- Vocal learning
- Whale sound
- Zoomusicology
- Phonology
