= Pheropsophus aequinoctialis =

Scientific classification
- Kingdom: Animalia
- Phylum: Arthropoda
- Clade: Pancrustacea
- Class: Insecta
- Order: Coleoptera
- Suborder: Adephaga
- Family: Carabidae
- Genus: Pheropsophus
- Species: P. aequinoctialis

Binomial name
- Pheropsophus aequinoctialis (Linnaeus, 1763)

Synonyms
- Cicindela aequinoctialis Linnaeus, 1763; Carabus complanatus Fabricius, 1775; Carabus planus Olivier, 1795

Species of beetle

Pheropsophus aequinoctialis is a species of ground beetle from Yucatán and Central and South America that feeds as larvae on the eggs of mole crickets but as an adult is a generalist feeder.

== Distribution ==
Pheropsophus aequinoctialis is the most widespread species in the genus Pheropsophus, with a distribution that stretches from Yucatán (Mexico) in the north to Peru, Bolivia, Uruguay and Catamarca and Jujuy provinces in Argentina in the south.

== Description ==
As well as being the most widespread, P. aequinoctialis is also the most variable species in the genus. It has a similar colour pattern to the beetles Phaeoxantha bifasciata, P. klugii and Trichognathus marginipennis, and all these species probably form a Müllerian mimicry complex.

== Ecology ==
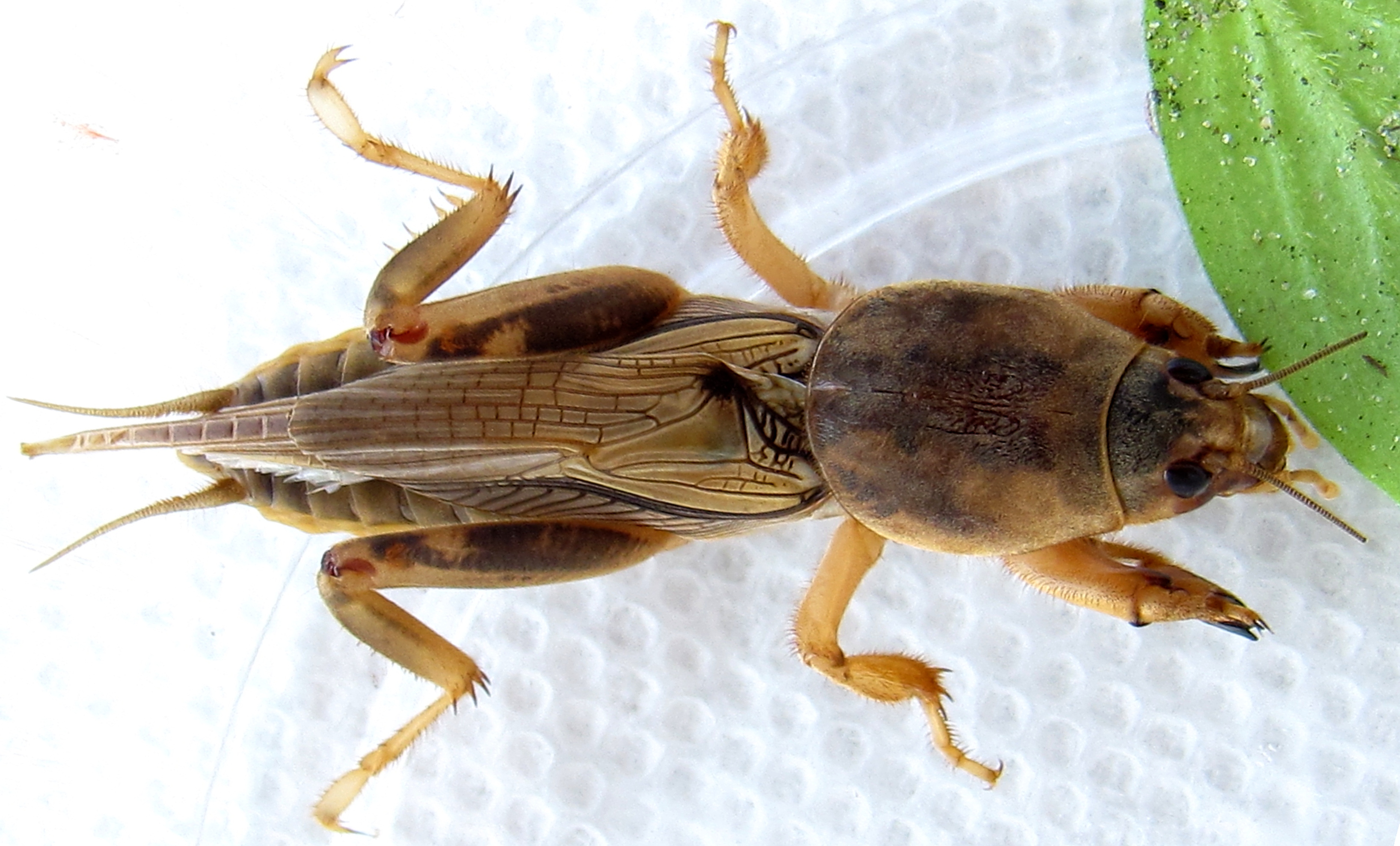
The larvae of Pheropsophus aequinoctialis eat eggs laid by mole crickets of the genus Scapteriscus (S. vicinus pictured).

Pheropsophus aequinoctialis adults are nocturnal, often hiding in groups during the day under stones, logs or clumps of grass, but emerging in the night to run along sandy trails or riverine beaches. In common with other members of the tribe Brachinini, they display a crepitating behaviour, and produce quinones.

Adults of P. aequinoctialis sometimes feed on plant matter, such as the fruit of the palm Astrocaryum, but are generally predators, especially of adult mole crickets of the genus Scapteriscus. P. aequinoctialis has therefore been considered as a potential biological control agent to control Scapteriscus species. Three species of Scapteriscus (S. abbreviatus, S. borellii & S. vicinus) are adventive species in Florida, having arrived around 1900 from South America. The mole crickets' burrowing and the feeding by their adults and nymphs larvae cause significant damage to several grass species, including Paspalum notatum, Cynodon dactylon, Eremochloa ophiuroides, Stenotaphrum secundatum, Zoysia spp. and Hemarthria altissima.

=== Life cycle ===
Pheropsophus aequinoctialis lays clutches of 25–60 eggs close to the burrows of mole crickets. The eggs are white and rectangular in outline, with rounded apices. The three instars (larval stages) which follow are white, with a cream head capsule, and darker colouration at the tips of the mouthparts. The first-instar larvae have long legs, and seek out the egg chambers within the mole cricket burrows. The second instar differs markedly from the first – a phenomenon known as hypermetamorphosis; they are shorter and wider, with much shorter legs. The larva feeds on the eggs of the mole crickets, and remains in the burrow until it has moulted into the imago (adult state). The pupa is of the typical form in ground beetles.

== Taxonomic history ==
Pheropsophus aequinoctialis was one of the first ground beetles to be described from the Neotropical realm. It was first described by Carl Linnaeus in his 1763 work Centuria Insectorum, under the name Cicindela aequinoctialis. It was also later described by Johan Christian Fabricius in 1775 as Carabus complanatus and by Guillaume-Antoine Olivier in 1795 as Carabus planus, both of which are junior synonyms of Pheropsophus aequinoctialis. It was later made the type species of the genus Pheropsophus.
