= Neoscapteriscus abbreviatus =

Scientific classification
- Domain: Eukaryota
- Kingdom: Animalia
- Phylum: Arthropoda
- Class: Insecta
- Order: Orthoptera
- Suborder: Ensifera
- Family: Gryllotalpidae
- Genus: Neoscapteriscus
- Species: N. abbreviatus

Binomial name
- Neoscapteriscus abbreviatus (Scudder, 1869)

Synonyms
- Scapteriscus abbreviatus Scudder, 1869

Species of cricket-like animal

Neoscapteriscus abbreviatus (syn. Scapteriscus abbreviatus), the short-winged mole cricket, is a species of insect in the mole cricket family, Gryllotalpidae. It is native to South America but has been introduced inadvertently into Florida, in the United States. Unlike other related species, it is unable to fly, nor do the males emit songs in order to attract females.

== Description ==
Neoscapteriscus abbreviatus is a medium-sized mole cricket with a length of from 22 to 29 mm (0.9 to 1.1 in). Its leathery forewings are shorter than its prothorax and its membranous hind wings are shorter than its forewings, rendering it unable to fly. Members of this genus are characterized by having two sharp claws and a blade-like process with a sharp edge on their forelegs. Other mole crickets have three or four claws. N. abbreviatus can be distinguished from the other members of its genus found in Florida, N. borellii and N. vicinus, by examining the two claws on its front leg. They diverge slightly and the distance between them at the base is equal or greater than the size of a claw base. The other two species have forewings that are longer than their prothorax, and hindwings that exceed the length of their abdomens.

== Distribution and habitat ==
Neoscapteriscus abbreviatus is native to South America where it is found in eastern Brazil. It is now also present in Central America and the West Indies. The type locality is Pernambuco in Brazil. It was accidentally introduced into Florida, United States, around 1900, probably with turf, manure or live plant material. It is mostly found in coastal regions and digs its burrows in sandy soils in grassland, fields, verges, turf and lawns.

== Control ==
Mole crickets cause more damage to turf than do other insects in Florida. In 1988, it was reported that some forty million dollars was spent each year on mole cricket control in the state, the main species targeted being S. abbreviatus and S. vicinus. It was customary to use organophosphates to control them, but these have fallen out of favour on environmental grounds. Fenoxycarb, a juvenile hormone analogue has been researched and was found to greatly reduce the number of eggs produced by each female S. abbreviatus.

Biological pest control has also been used, with the introduction into Florida of certain natural enemies to the mole crickets from South America. The parasitoid wasp Larra bicolor deposits larvae on adult mole crickets and the fly Ormia depleta acts in a similar manner, laying eggs on them; in both cases, the developing larvae devour the tissues of the host. The mole cricket nematode (Steinernema scapterisci) liberates a bacterium which causes sepsis and death to its host mole cricket.
