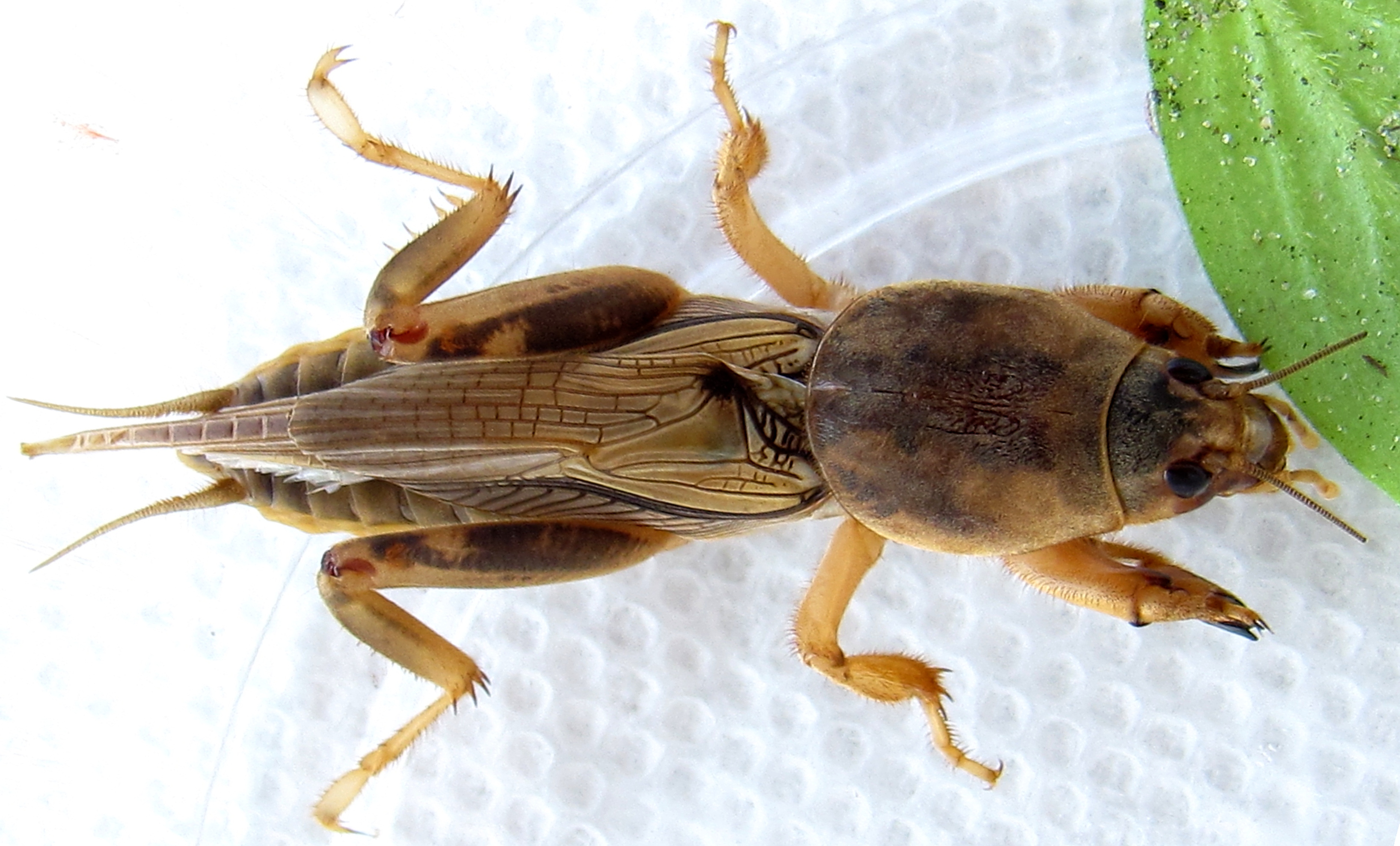
- Scapteriscus vicinus

Scientific classification
- Domain: Eukaryota
- Kingdom: Animalia
- Phylum: Arthropoda
- Class: Insecta
- Order: Orthoptera
- Suborder: Ensifera
- Family: Gryllotalpidae
- Subfamily: Scapteriscinae
- Tribe: Scapteriscini
- Genus: Scapteriscus; Scudder, 1869

Species
- see text

= Scapteriscus =

Genus of cricket-like animals

Scapteriscus is a genus of insects in the family Gryllotalpidae, the mole crickets. Members of the genus are called two-clawed mole crickets. They are native to South America. Some species have arrived in other regions (by flight or as contaminants of ship ballast or cargoes), including parts of North America, where some have become invasive and have become established as pests.

== Description ==
These are medium-sized or large mole crickets characterized by the structures on their forelegs: two sharp claws and a blade-like process with a sharp flange or tooth. Other mole crickets have three or four claws. Like other mole crickets, these burrow in the ground and the males produce calls with their tegmina.

== Impacts ==
Scapteriscus species have been called "the most damaging crickets in the New World". The major pest species include S. abbreviatus, S. borellii, S. didactylus, and S. vicinus. These burrowing insects are pests of lawns, pastures, and gardens. Some species feed on plant roots and seedlings, while others are carnivorous and damage turf with their digging activity. They are notorious in the Southeastern United States, where they have been called "the most damaging insect pests of turf and pasture grasses in Florida". S. didactylus is invasive in Australia, where it damages turf, especially on golf courses, and attacks crops such as rice and peppers.

In French Guiana, S. didactylus is a predator of the eggs of the critically endangered leatherback sea turtle (Dermochelys coriacea).

Agents of biological pest control have proved effective for these mole crickets. The nematode Steinernema scapterisci kills the mole cricket by carrying bacteria into its body, introducing an overwhelming infection. The tachinid fly Ormia depleta is a parasitoid that leaves its carnivorous larva on the body of the mole cricket The crabronid wasp Larra bicolor (family Crabronidae) catches the mole cricket and sticks an egg to it. When the larva emerges, it consumes the mole cricket alive.

== Diversity ==
In 2003, 21 species were in the genus. More have since been described.

Species include:

- Scapteriscus abbreviatus – short-winged mole cricket
- Scapteriscus borellii – southern mole cricket
- Scapteriscus cerberus
- Scapteriscus costaricensis
- Scapteriscus didactyloides
- Scapteriscus didactylus – West Indian mole cricket, changa
- Scapteriscus ecuadorensis
- Scapteriscus grossi
- Scapteriscus imitatus – imitator mole cricket
- Scapteriscus macrocellus
- Scapteriscus peruvianus
- Scapteriscus quadripunctatus
- Scapteriscus saileri
- Scapteriscus tenuis
- Scapteriscus vicinus – tawny mole cricket
- Scapteriscus zeuneri

Two species of Scapteriscus were separated and placed in the new genus Indioscaptor.
