= Ormia depleta =

Scientific classification
- Kingdom: Animalia
- Phylum: Arthropoda
- Clade: Pancrustacea
- Class: Insecta
- Order: Diptera
- Family: Tachinidae
- Subfamily: Tachininae
- Tribe: Ormiini
- Genus: Ormia
- Species: O. depleta

Binomial name
- Ormia depleta (Wiedemann, 1830)

Synonyms
- Tachina depleta Wiedemann, 1830

Species of fly

Ormia depleta, sometimes called the Brazilian red-eyed fly, is a species of fly in the family Tachinidae. It is a parasitoid of mole crickets in the genus Scapteriscus. It is native to South America but has been imported into the United States and elsewhere as a biological pest control agent.

== Biology ==
Ormia depleta has four stages in its life cycle, egg, larva, pupa and adult. The adult female is attracted by the song of either the tawny mole cricket (Neoscapteriscus vicinus) or the southern mole cricket (Neoscapteriscus borellii). The repeated chirps are emitted by the male crickets to attract females to breed, and the song also lures the female fly. Her eggs hatch inside her abdomen and she deposits a larva on any mole cricket with which she comes in contact. The fly larva feeds on the mole cricket and eventually kills it, then the fly larva emerges from the carcass and makes its way into the soil where it pupates. The adult fly emerges from the pupa about eleven days later. It feeds on the honeydew secreted by insects such as aphids.

== Biological control ==
Ormia depleta has been used for biological pest control of mole crickets in Florida. The mole crickets make shallow burrows in pastures, golf courses and lawns and do considerable damage to the turf. During the period 1987 to 1992, researchers from the University of Florida released adult Ormia depleta. The flies can travel considerable distances while looking for mole crickets to parasitise, so a large number of flies is not needed. The program has been successful, and the flies are present all-year-round in the central and southern parts of Florida, but largely die out in winter in the northern region. Other biological control agents are also used in Florida against Neoscapteriscus spp. mole crickets; Larra bicolor is a parasitoid wasp native to South America, the larvae of which also feed on and kill the pest; Steinernema scapterisci is a parasitic nematode, also from South America, that kills the adult cricket by liberating bacteria that cause sepsis.

== Native Distribution ==
Honduras, Brazil, French Guiana, Paraguay, Peru.
