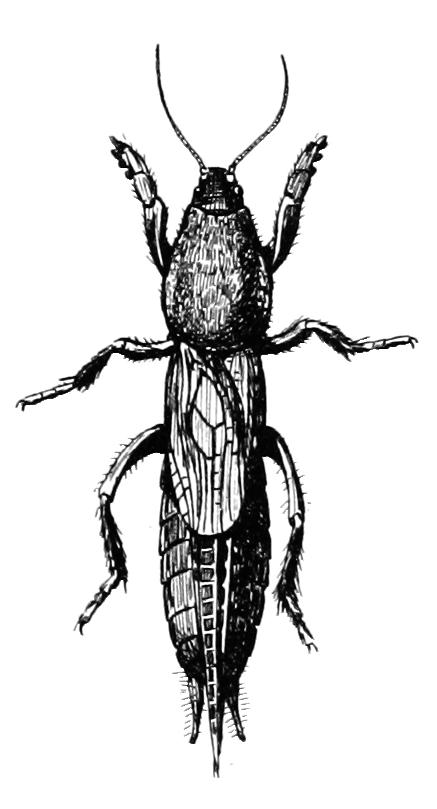
- Illustration of Neocurtilla hexadactyla from Insects, their way and means of living by Robert Evans Snodgrass.

Scientific classification
- Kingdom: Animalia
- Phylum: Arthropoda
- Class: Insecta
- Order: Orthoptera
- Suborder: Ensifera
- Family: Gryllotalpidae
- Genus: Neocurtilla
- Species: N. hexadactyla

Binomial name
- Neocurtilla hexadactyla (Perty, 1832)

= Neocurtilla hexadactyla =

Northern mole cricket

Species of cricket-like animal

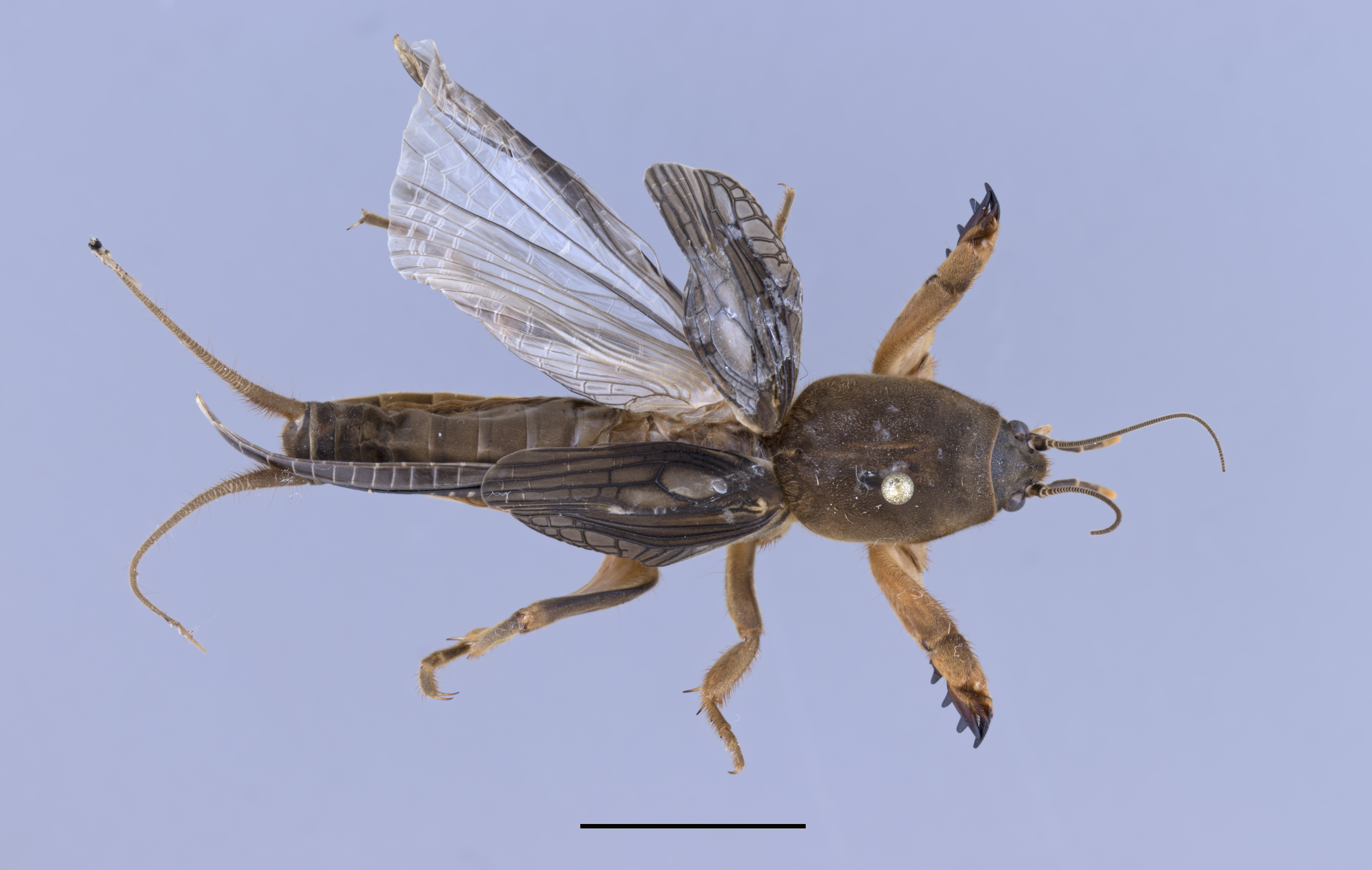
Figure 1. Collected in GA Baldwin Co a Neocurtilla hexadactyla (Perty 1832) found on September 23, 2024, by S. Mears

Neocurtilla hexadactyla, commonly known as the northern mole cricket, is a species of mole cricket that is native to eastern North America. It also occurs in South America, where it may be an adventive species. Its range extends from the southern reaches of eastern Canada and through the eastern and central United States. It is preyed upon by the wasp Larra analis, which parasitizes live mole cricket hosts.
