= Phaeoxantha lindemannae =

Scientific classification
- Kingdom: Animalia
- Phylum: Arthropoda
- Clade: Pancrustacea
- Class: Insecta
- Order: Coleoptera
- Suborder: Adephaga
- Family: Cicindelidae
- Genus: Phaeoxantha
- Species: P. lindemannae

Binomial name
- Phaeoxantha lindemannae (Mandl, 1964)

Synonyms
- Megacephala lindemannae Mandl, 1964

Species of beetle

Phaeoxantha lindemannae is a species of tiger beetle in the subfamily Cicindelinae that was described by Mandl in 1964.
