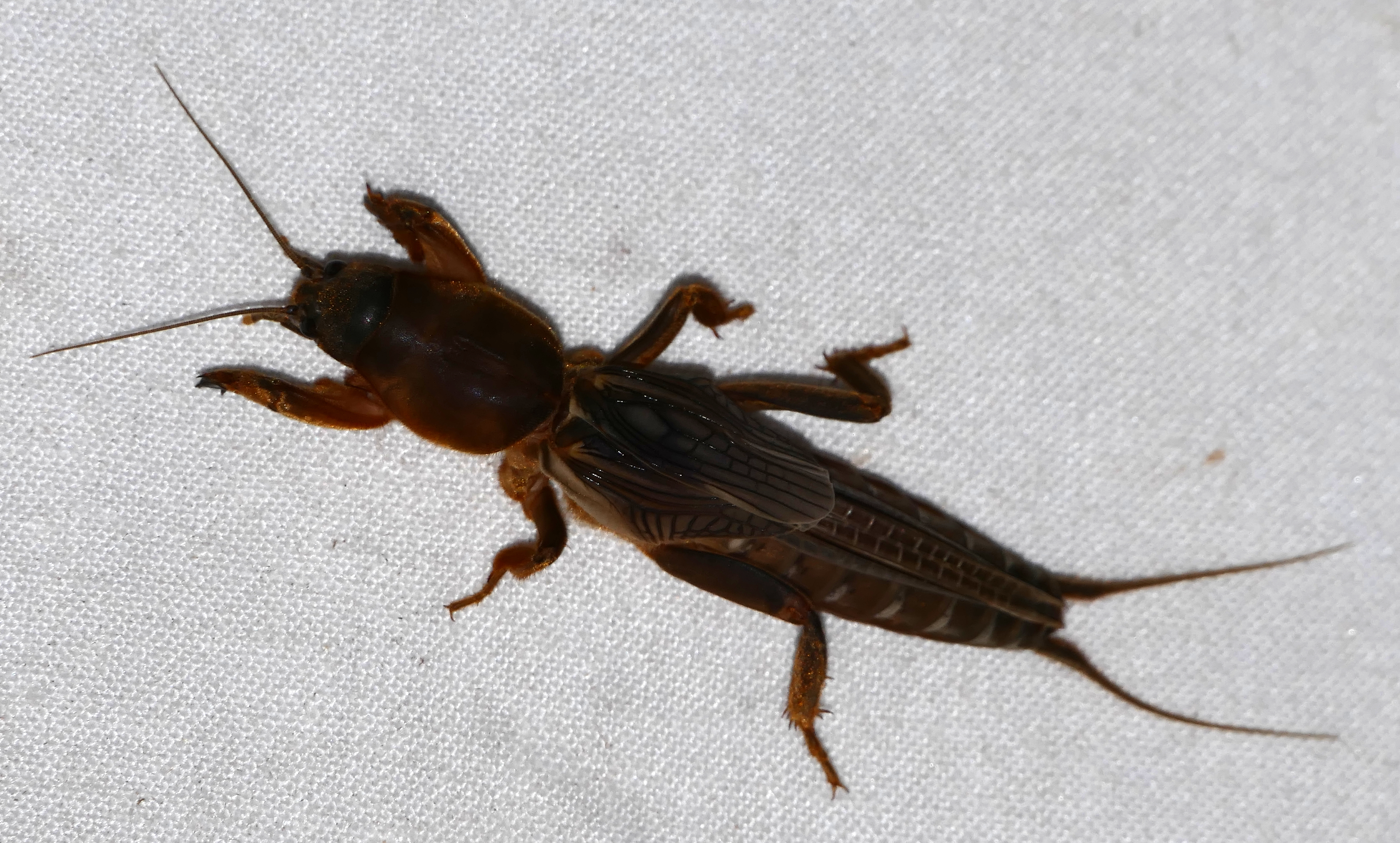
- Neocurtilla hexadactyla, Northern Mole Cricket

Scientific classification
- Domain: Eukaryota
- Kingdom: Animalia
- Phylum: Arthropoda
- Class: Insecta
- Order: Orthoptera
- Suborder: Ensifera
- Family: Gryllotalpidae
- Subfamily: Gryllotalpinae
- Tribe: Neocurtillini
- Genus: Neocurtilla; Kirby, 1906

= Neocurtilla =

Genus of cricket-like animals

Neocurtilla is a genus of northern mole crickets in the family Gryllotalpidae. There are about seven described species in Neocurtilla, found primarily in North, Central, and South America.

== Species ==
These seven species belong to the genus Neocurtilla:

- Neocurtilla claraziana (Saussure, 1874)
- Neocurtilla hexadactyla (Perty, 1832) (northern mole cricket)
- Neocurtilla ingrischi Cadena-Castañeda, 2015
- Neocurtilla robusta Canhedo-Lascombe & Corseuil, 1996
- Neocurtilla scutata (Chopard, 1930)
- Neocurtilla townsendi Cadena-Castañeda, 2015
- † Neocurtilla schmidtgeni Zeuner, 1937
