= Phaeoxantha laminata =

Scientific classification
- Domain: Eukaryota
- Kingdom: Animalia
- Phylum: Arthropoda
- Class: Insecta
- Order: Coleoptera
- Suborder: Adephaga
- Family: Cicindelidae
- Genus: Phaeoxantha
- Species: P. laminata

Binomial name
- Phaeoxantha laminata (Perty, 1830)

Synonyms
- Megacephala laminata Perty, 1830; Megacephala limata Perty, 1833 (Missp.); Megacephala asperula Westwood, 1852; Megacephala brevis Westwood, 1852 (Unav.); Megacephala brevipennis Westwood, 1852 (Unav.)

Species of beetle

Phaeoxantha laminata is a species of tiger beetle in the subfamily Cicindelinae that was described by Perty in 1830, and can be found in Argentina, Brazil, Paraguay, and Peru. Its species name has frequently been misspelled as limata.
