= Phaeoxantha =

Scientific classification
- Domain: Eukaryota
- Kingdom: Animalia
- Phylum: Arthropoda
- Class: Insecta
- Order: Coleoptera
- Suborder: Adephaga
- Family: Cicindelidae
- Tribe: Megacephalini
- Genus: Phaeoxantha; Chaudoir, 1850

Synonyms
- Ammosia Westwood, 1852

Genus of beetles

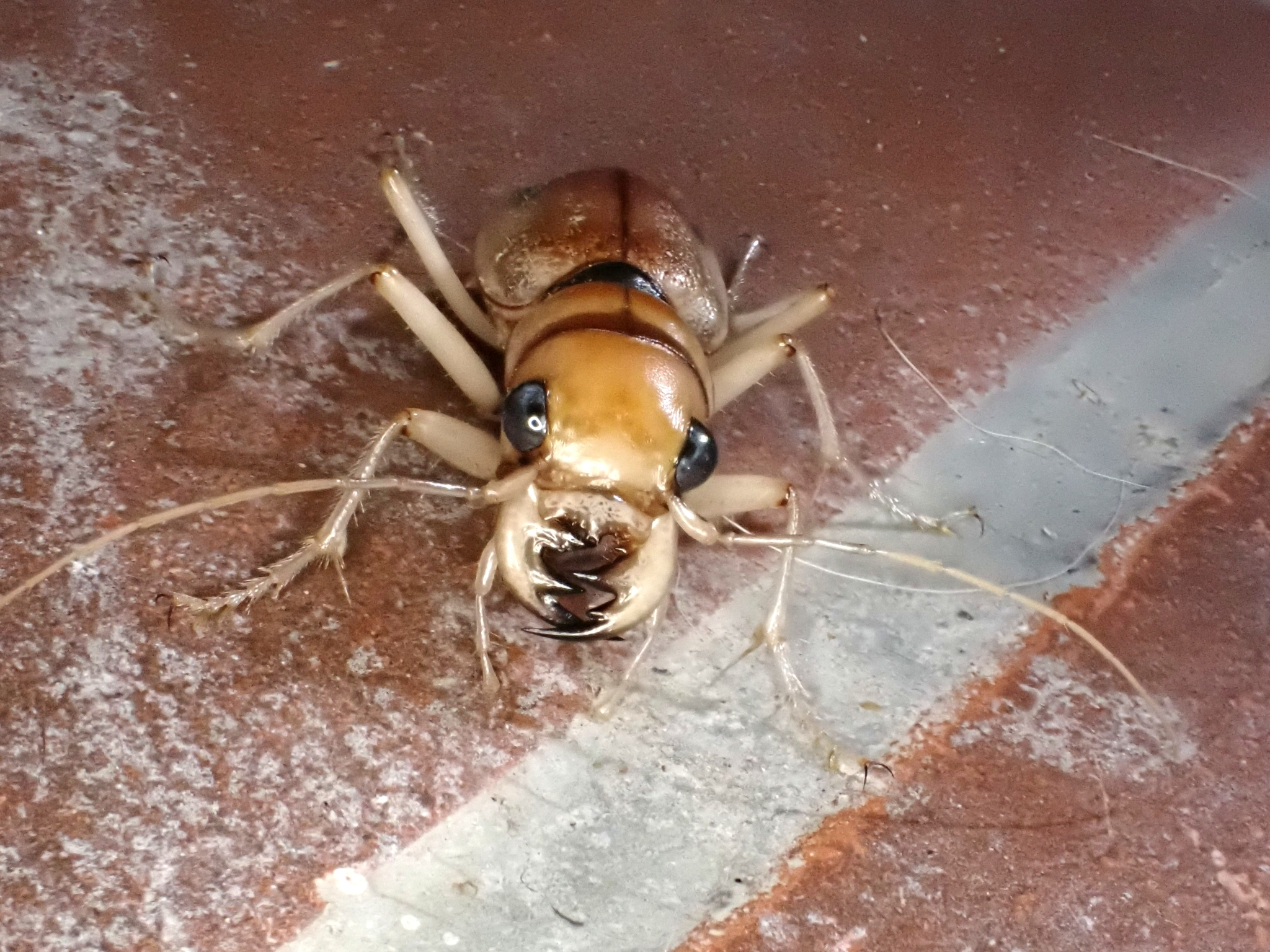
Phaeoxantha klugii

Phaeoxantha is a genus of tiger beetles in the family Cicindelidae, formerly included within the genus Megacephala.

== Species ==
- Phaeoxantha bifasciata (Brullé, 1837)
- Phaeoxantha bucephala (W. Horn, 1909)
- Phaeoxantha cruciata (Brulle, 1837)
- Phaeoxantha epipleuralis Horn, 1923
- Phaeoxantha klugii Chaudoir, 1850
- Phaeoxantha laminata (Perty, 1830)
- Phaeoxantha lindemannae (Mandl, 1964)
- Phaeoxantha nocturna (Dejean, 1831)
- Phaeoxantha paranocturna Moravec & Dheurle 2023
- Phaeoxantha testudinea (Klug, 1834)
- Phaeoxantha tremolerasi (W. Horn, 1909)
- Phaeoxantha wimmeri (Mandl, 1958)
