= Phaeoxantha wimmeri =

Scientific classification
- Kingdom: Animalia
- Phylum: Arthropoda
- Clade: Pancrustacea
- Class: Insecta
- Order: Coleoptera
- Suborder: Adephaga
- Family: Cicindelidae
- Genus: Phaeoxantha
- Species: P. wimmeri

Binomial name
- Phaeoxantha wimmeri (Mandl, 1958)

Synonyms
- Megacephala wimmeri Mandl, 1958

Species of beetle

Phaeoxantha wimmeri is a brown coloured species of tiger beetle in the subfamily Cicindelinae that was described by Mandl in 1958, and is endemic to Santa Cruz, Bolivia.
