= Phaeoxantha tremolerasi =

Scientific classification
- Domain: Eukaryota
- Kingdom: Animalia
- Phylum: Arthropoda
- Class: Insecta
- Order: Coleoptera
- Suborder: Adephaga
- Family: Cicindelidae
- Genus: Phaeoxantha
- Species: P. tremolerasi

Binomial name
- Phaeoxantha tremolerasi (W. Horn, 1909)

Synonyms
- Megacephala tremolerasi Horn, 1909; Phaeoxantha tremolerasi barberoiana Podtiaguin, 1941

Species of beetle

Phaeoxantha tremolerasi is a species of tiger beetle in the subfamily Cicindelinae that was described by W. Horn in 1909.
