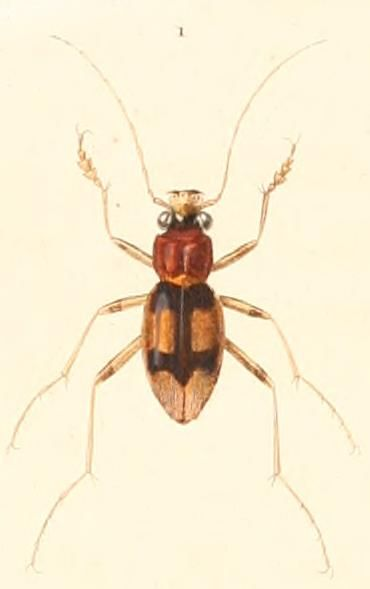

Scientific classification
- Domain: Eukaryota
- Kingdom: Animalia
- Phylum: Arthropoda
- Class: Insecta
- Order: Coleoptera
- Suborder: Adephaga
- Family: Cicindelidae
- Genus: Phaeoxantha
- Species: P. bifasciata

Binomial name
- Phaeoxantha bifasciata (Brullé, 1837)

Synonyms
- Megacephala aequinoctialis Dejean, 1825 (Misid.); Megacephala bifasciata Brullé, 1837; Megacephala quinoctialis [sic] v. Frontalis Dejean, 1837 (Nom. Nud.); Tetracha Aequinoxialis Thomson, 1857 (Missp.); Tetracha Ephippium Thomson, 1857 (Nom. Nud.); Megacephala ab. obscura Dokhtouroff, 1882 (Preocc.); Phaeoxantha puberula Chaudoir, 1865 (Nom. Nud.)

= Phaeoxantha bifasciata =

Species of beetle

Phaeoxantha bifasciata is a species of tiger beetle in the subfamily Cicindelinae that was described by Brullé in 1837, though for most of the past 200 years it has erroneously been recognized under the name aequinoctialis, a name based on a misidentified bombardier beetle (Pheropsophus aequinoctialis). The species is found in South American countries like Argentina, Bolivia, Brazil, Colombia, Ecuador, French Guiana, Peru, and Venezuela.
