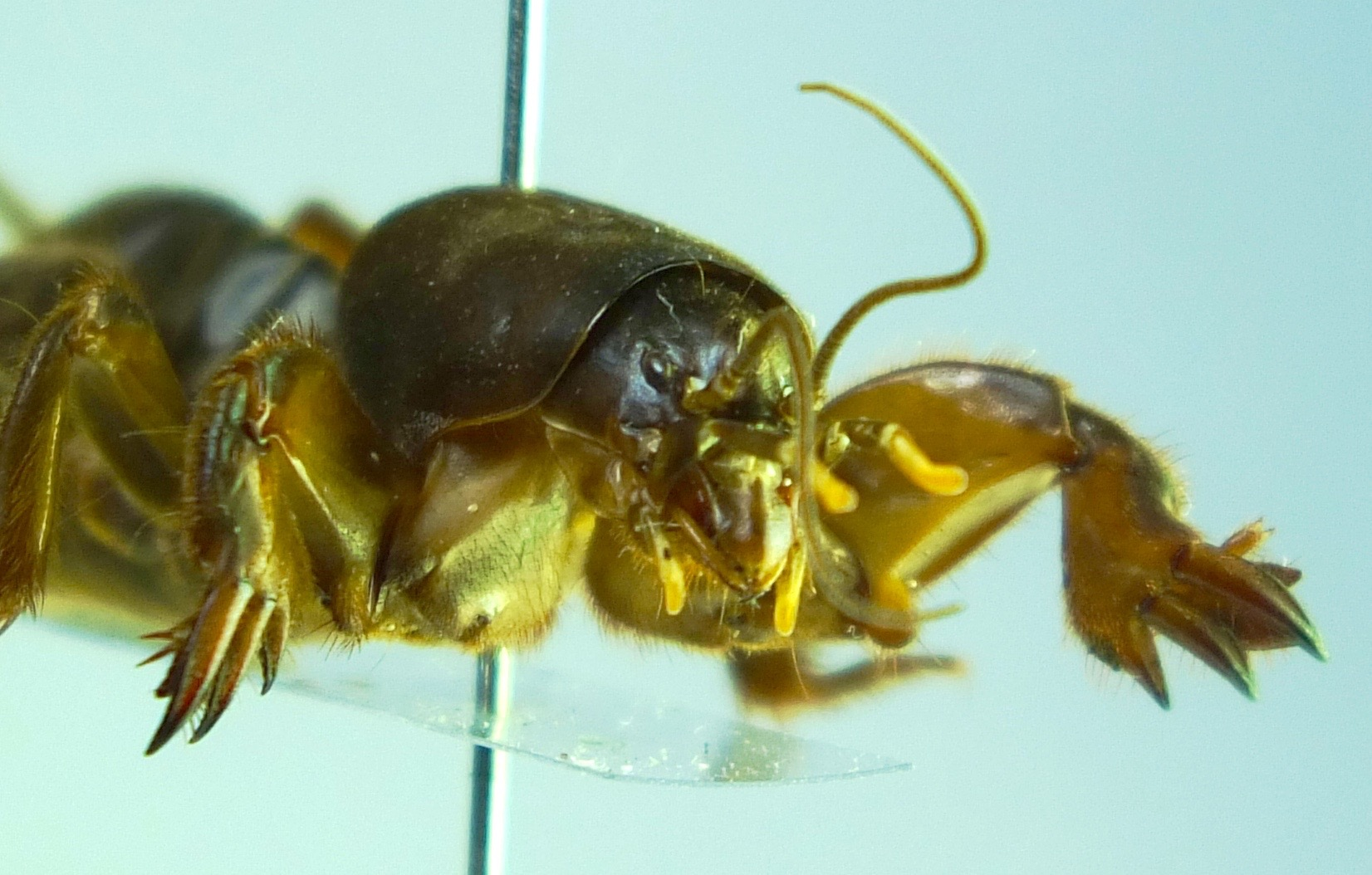
- New Zealand mole cricket or honi

Scientific classification
- Kingdom: Animalia
- Phylum: Arthropoda
- Clade: Pancrustacea
- Class: Insecta
- Order: Orthoptera
- Suborder: Ensifera
- Family: Gryllotalpidae
- Subfamily: Gryllotalpinae
- Tribe: Triamescaptorini; Cadena-Castañeda, 2015
- Genus: Triamescaptor; Tindale, 1928
- Species: T. aotea

Binomial name
- Triamescaptor aotea Tindale, 1928

= New Zealand mole cricket =

Triamescaptor aotea

Species of cricket-like animal

The New Zealand mole cricket (Triamescaptor aotea) is a wingless member of the mole cricket family Gryllotalpidae. Endemic to New Zealand, it lives underground and is rarely seen. It is now restricted to parts of the southern North Island.

== Taxonomy ==
The mole cricket was well known to Māori, who encountered it when cultivating garden plots and called it honi. Mole crickets collected in New Zealand were assumed to be the European species Gryllotalpa vulgaris (a synonym of Gryllotalpa gryllotalpa), which has a wingless nymph that resembles the adult New Zealand species. Triamescaptor aotea was named and described by Norman Tindale in 1928 from two specimens collected in 1915 at Aramoho, Whanganui. It is the only species in its genus, and the only genus in tribe Triamescaptorini. Its closest relatives are two Australian species of Gryllotalpa. Triamescaptor is sometimes incorrectly spelled "Trimescaptor" in later publications.

== Description ==
Triamescaptor aotea caught at McPhersons Bush, Whanganui.

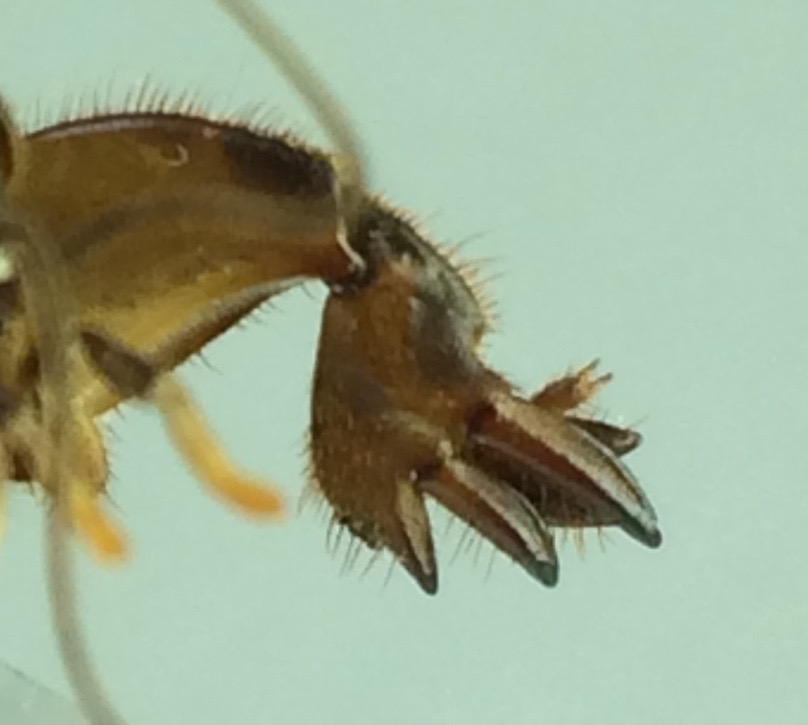
Foreleg of a New Zealand mole cricket (Triamescaptor aotea) showing the two movable and one fixed dactyls used for digging.

Triamescaptor aotea is 20–30 millimetres (0.79–1.18 in) long, and medium to dark brown in colour, with distinct protruding antennae and long rear processes (or cerci). Its rear cerci are sensory, and in its tunnel it is able to move backwards as easily as forwards. The first segment of its thorax is extended, rounded, and armoured. Its front legs are heavily modified for digging, flattened and shovel-like, with just three claw-like processes or dactyls on its tibia (Gryllotalpa has four), two movable and one fixed.

The New Zealand mole cricket, unlike other species of Gryllotalpidae, has no wings, not even vestiges. Because mole crickets produce sound by stridulation of their wings, this species is necessarily silent and lacks the ears other species have on their front tibia. Any winged mole crickets found in New Zealand are likely to be introduced European Gryllotalpa, with which the New Zealand species has sometimes been confused.

== Ecology ==
New Zealand mole crickets live underground, in circular galleries roughly 10 centimetres (3.9 in) in diameter and 10–20 centimetres (3.9–7.9 in) below the surface. Females lay clutches of eggs in side chambers off the gallery and guard them until they hatch. They are omnivorous, feeding on the roots of plants and other burrowing insects such as grass grubs (Costelytra zealandica) and porina moth caterpillars (Wiseana). During rain or flooding mole crickets emerge from their burrows to feed; they have been recovered from the stomachs of eels at Lake Pounui in the Wairarapa, which forage in flooded paddocks at night.

== Distribution ==
Because it lives underground this species is vulnerable to agricultural cultivation. Formerly widespread, it now seems to be localised to parts of the lower North Island, including Hawke's Bay, Whanganui, near Levin, Lake Wairarapa and Lake Pounui, and on D'Urville Island. It is probably also eaten by introduced rats. The Department of Conservation considers the species at risk because it is naturally uncommon.
