= Phaeoxantha nocturna =

Scientific classification
- Kingdom: Animalia
- Phylum: Arthropoda
- Class: Insecta
- Order: Coleoptera
- Suborder: Adephaga
- Family: Cicindelidae
- Genus: Phaeoxantha
- Species: P. nocturna

Binomial name
- Phaeoxantha nocturna (Dejean, 1831)

Synonyms
- Megacephala Nocturna Dejean, 1831; Megacephala Menetriesii Dejean, 1837 (Nom. Nud.); Megacephala brevicollis Chaudoir, 1865 (Unav.); Megacephala (Phaeoxantha) Menetriesi Horn, 1905 (Missp.)

Species of beetle

Phaeoxantha nocturna is a species of tiger beetle in the subfamily Cicindelinae that was described by Dejean in 1831.

== Subspecies ==
- Phaeoxantha nocturna nocturna (Dejean, 1831)
- Phaeoxantha nocturna crassipunctata Moravec & Dheurle, 2023
