= Phaeoxantha testudinea =

Scientific classification
- Domain: Eukaryota
- Kingdom: Animalia
- Phylum: Arthropoda
- Class: Insecta
- Order: Coleoptera
- Suborder: Adephaga
- Family: Cicindelidae
- Genus: Phaeoxantha
- Species: P. testudinea

Binomial name
- Phaeoxantha testudinea (Klug, 1834)

Synonyms
- Megacephala testudinea Klug, 1834

Species of beetle

Phaeoxantha testudinea is a species of tiger beetle in the subfamily Cicindelinae that was described by Klug in 1834.
