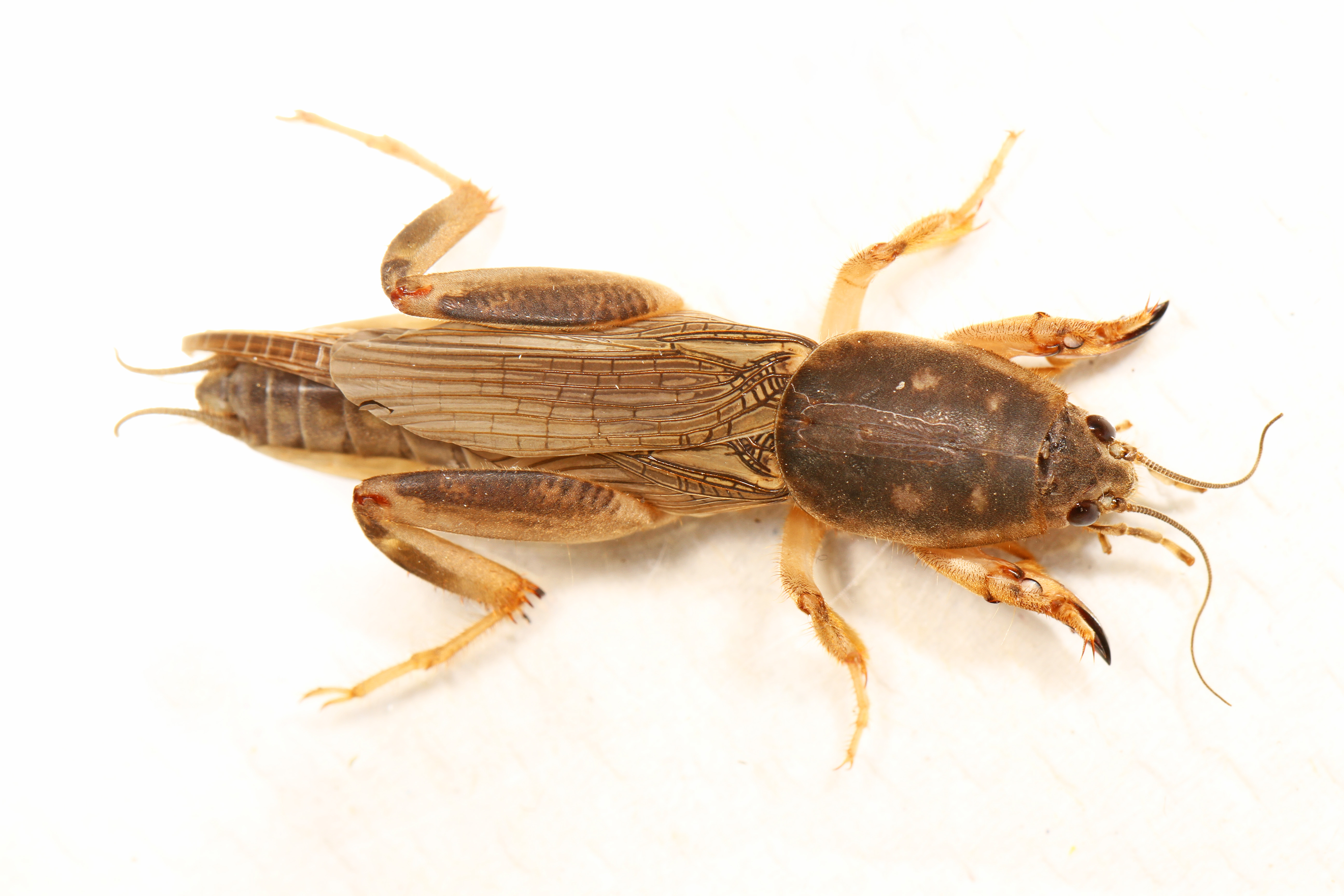

Scientific classification
- Kingdom: Animalia
- Phylum: Arthropoda
- Clade: Pancrustacea
- Class: Insecta
- Order: Orthoptera
- Suborder: Ensifera
- Family: Gryllotalpidae
- Genus: Neoscapteriscus
- Species: N. borellii

Binomial name
- Neoscapteriscus borellii (Giglio-Tos, 1894)

Synonyms
- Scapteriscus acletus Rehn & Hebard, 1916; Scapteriscus borellii Giglio-Tos, 1894

= Neoscapteriscus borellii =

Species of cricket-like animal

Neoscapteriscus borellii, the southern mole cricket, is a species of insect in the family Gryllotalpidae.

It is native to South America but is also present in the southern United States where it was introduced around 1900.

== Description ==
Scapteriscus borellii is a fairly large mole cricket growing to a length of about 3 cm (1.2 in). Like other members of this genus, it is characterized by having two sharp claws and a blade-like process with a sharp edge on its forelegs. Other mole crickets have three or four claws. The two claws are separated at the base by a gap half the width of the claw, which distinguishes this species from the tawny mole cricket (S. vicinus) which has claws that nearly touch at the base. The tegmina (forewings) are longer than the prothorax and the membranous hind wings are longer than the abdomen, which distinguishes it from the short-winged mole cricket (S. abbreviatus) whose hind wings are shorter than the forewings and which is unable to fly. The call, sung only by males, usually within two hours of sunset, is a low-pitched trill with a pulse rate of about 50 per second.

== Ecology ==
In its native South America, populations of S. borellii are kept under control by natural enemies, but in the southern United States, where it appeared in the early 1900s, it is regarded as an invasive pest species. It lives in shallow burrows in sandy soil and causes damage to lawns, pastures, golf courses and cultivated plants, primarily through its burrowing activities which loosen the soil, uproot plants and cause the soil to dry out.

Unlike the two closely related, herbivorous species (S. vicinus and S. abbreviatus), it is mainly a predator. Breeding takes place in the spring and there may be two generations of nymphs in southern Florida during the summer, but only one further north. More breeding activity in the autumn results in large overwintering nymphs.

In an attempt to reduce the damage done by Scapteriscus mole crickets in Florida, biological pest control has been attempted using natural enemies introduced from South America. Larra bicolor is a parasitoid wasp which deposits larvae on adult mole crickets while the fly Ormia depleta lays egg on them; in both cases, the developing larvae devour the host's tissues. The mole cricket nematode (Steinernema scapterisci) liberates a bacterium which causes sepsis and death to its host mole cricket.
