= Phaeoxantha bucephala =

Scientific classification
- Kingdom: Animalia
- Phylum: Arthropoda
- Class: Insecta
- Order: Coleoptera
- Suborder: Adephaga
- Family: Cicindelidae
- Genus: Phaeoxantha
- Species: P. bucephala

Binomial name
- Phaeoxantha bucephala (W. Horn, 1909)

Synonyms
- Megacephala bucephala Horn, 1909

Species of beetle

Phaeoxantha bucephala is a species of tiger beetle in the subfamily Cicindelinae, described by W. Horn in 1909.
