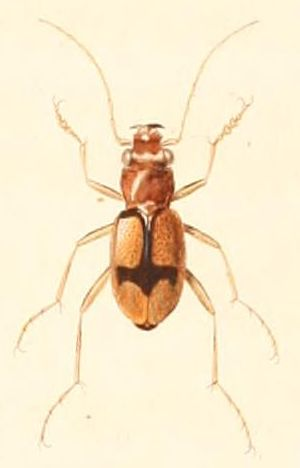

Scientific classification
- Domain: Eukaryota
- Kingdom: Animalia
- Phylum: Arthropoda
- Class: Insecta
- Order: Coleoptera
- Suborder: Adephaga
- Family: Cicindelidae
- Genus: Phaeoxantha
- Species: P. cruciata

Binomial name
- Phaeoxantha cruciata (Brullé, 1837)

Synonyms
- Megacephala cruciata Brullé, 1837

= Phaeoxantha cruciata =

Species of beetle

Phaeoxantha cruciata is a species of tiger beetle in the subfamily Cicindelinae that was described by Brulle in 1837. The species is common in Argentina, Bolivia, Brazil, Paraguay, and Uruguay.

== Subspecies ==
- Phaeoxantha cruciata cruciata (Brullé, 1837)
- Phaeoxantha cruciata pilosula Horn, 1923
