= Phaeoxantha epipleuralis =

Scientific classification
- Kingdom: Animalia
- Phylum: Arthropoda
- Class: Insecta
- Order: Coleoptera
- Suborder: Adephaga
- Family: Cicindelidae
- Genus: Phaeoxantha
- Species: P. epipleuralis

Binomial name
- Phaeoxantha epipleuralis Horn, 1923

Synonyms
- Megacephala epipleuralis (Horn, 1923)

Species of beetle

Phaeoxantha epipleuralis is a species of tiger beetle in the subfamily Cicindelinae that was described by George Henry Horn in 1923. The species has been recorded in South America, particularly in Brazil.
