= Phaeoxantha klugii =

Scientific classification
- Kingdom: Animalia
- Phylum: Arthropoda
- Class: Insecta
- Order: Coleoptera
- Suborder: Adephaga
- Family: Cicindelidae
- Genus: Phaeoxantha
- Species: P. klugii

Binomial name
- Phaeoxantha klugii Chaudoir, 1850

Synonyms
- Megacephala klugii (Chaudoir, 1850); Ammosia testudinea Westwood, 1852 (Preocc.); Megacephala (Phaeoxantha) klugi Horn, 1905 (Missp.)

Species of beetle

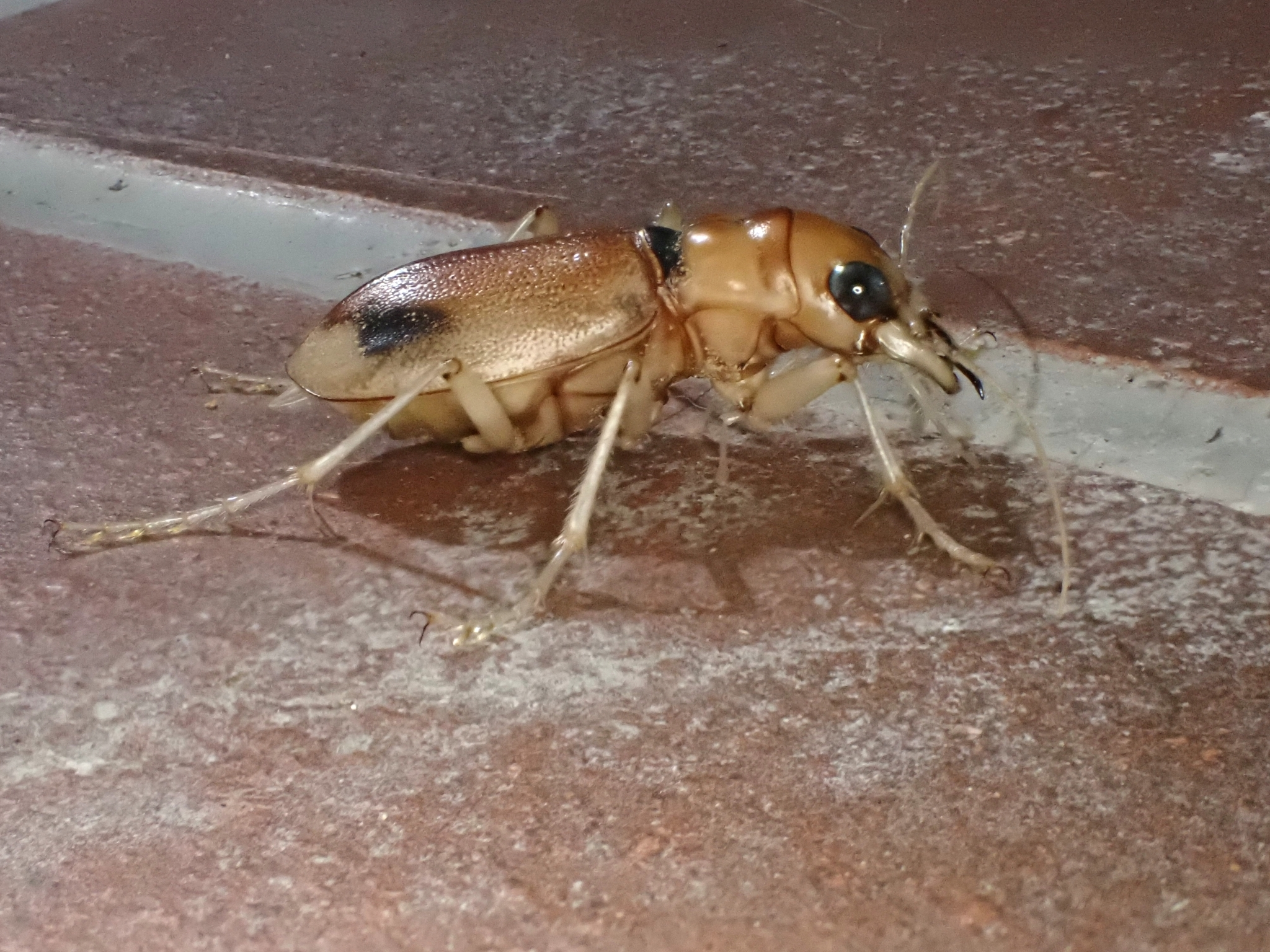

Phaeoxantha klugii is a species of tiger beetle in the subfamily Cicindelinae that was described by Maximilien Chaudoir in 1850.
