= Larra analis =

Scientific classification
- Kingdom: Animalia
- Phylum: Arthropoda
- Class: Insecta
- Order: Hymenoptera
- Family: Crabronidae
- Genus: Larra
- Species: L. analis

Binomial name
- Larra analis Fabricius, 1804

Synonyms
- Ancistromma canescens (F. Smith, 1856); Larra americana (Cresson, 1873); Larra canescens (F. Smith, 1856); Larra cressoni W. Fox, 1894; Larrada americana Cresson, 1873; Larrada canescens F. Smith, 1856

Species of wasp

Larra analis is a species of square-headed wasp in the family Crabronidae. It is found in North America, where it commonly preys upon northern mole crickets.
