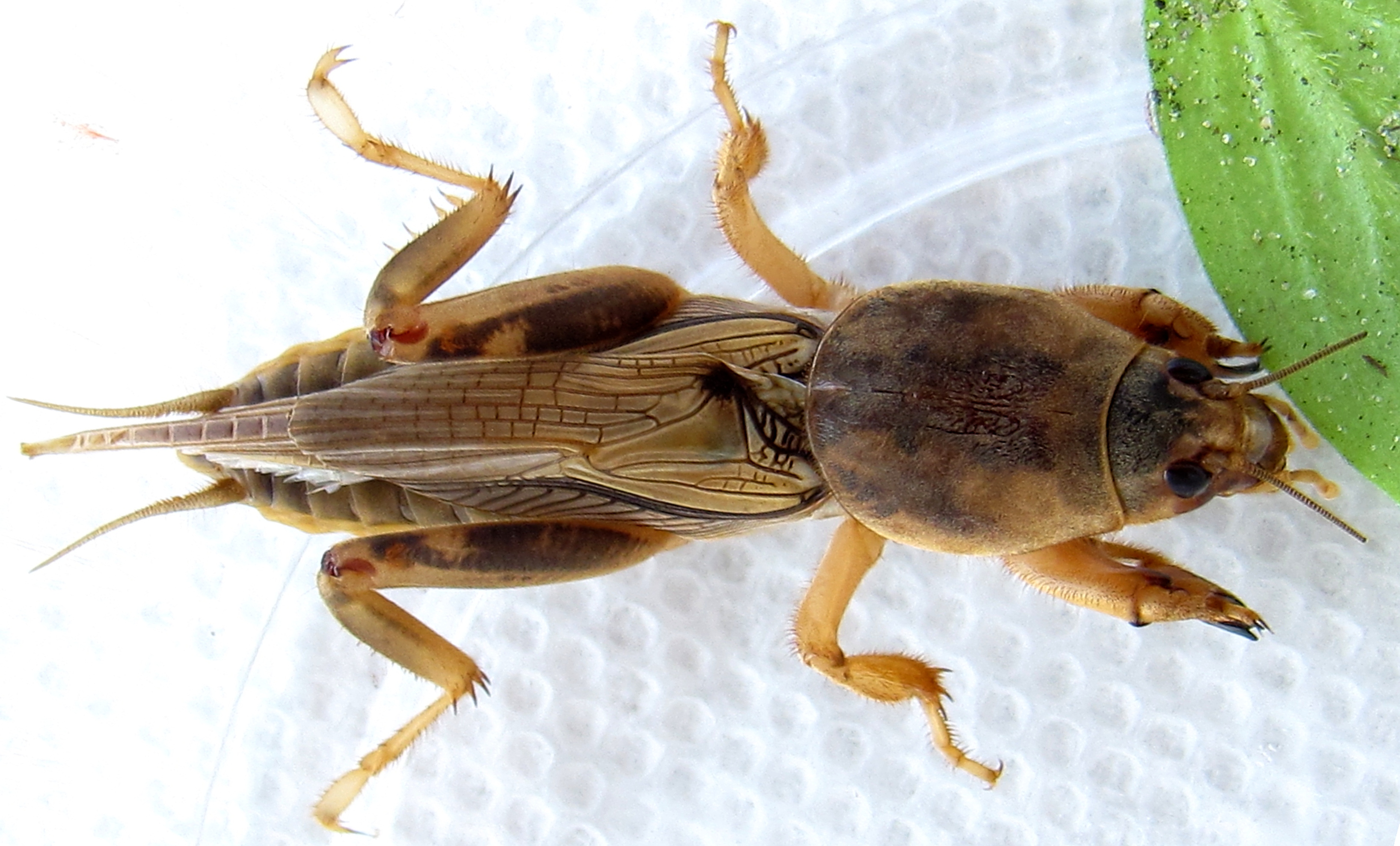
- Neoscapteriscus vicinus

Scientific classification
- Kingdom: Animalia
- Phylum: Arthropoda
- Class: Insecta
- Order: Orthoptera
- Suborder: Ensifera
- Family: Gryllotalpidae
- Subfamily: Scapteriscinae
- Tribe: Scapteriscini
- Genus: Neoscapteriscus; Cadena-Castañeda, 2015

= Neoscapteriscus =

Genus of cricket-like animals

Neoscapteriscus is a genus of two-clawed mole crickets in the family Gryllotalpidae. At least 23 described species are placed in Neoscapteriscus.

== Species ==
- Neoscapteriscus abbreviatus (Scudder, S.H., 1869) (lesser short-winged mole cricket)
- Neoscapteriscus borellii (Giglio-Tos, 1894) (southern mole cricket)
- Neoscapteriscus cerberus (Rodríguez, F. & Heads, 2012)
- Neoscapteriscus costaricensis (Nickle, 2003)
- Neoscapteriscus didactyloides
- Neoscapteriscus didactylus (changa mole cricket)
- Neoscapteriscus ecuadorensis
- Neoscapteriscus grossi
- Neoscapteriscus imitatus
- Neoscapteriscus macrocellus
- Neoscapteriscus mexicanus
- Neoscapteriscus parvipennis
- Neoscapteriscus peruvianus
- Neoscapteriscus quadripunctatus
- Neoscapteriscus riograndensis
- Neoscapteriscus rodriguezi
- Neoscapteriscus saileri
- Neoscapteriscus tenuis
- Neoscapteriscus tetradactylus
- Neoscapteriscus tibiodentalis
- Neoscapteriscus variegatus
- Neoscapteriscus vicinus (tawny mole cricket)
- Neoscapteriscus zeuneri
