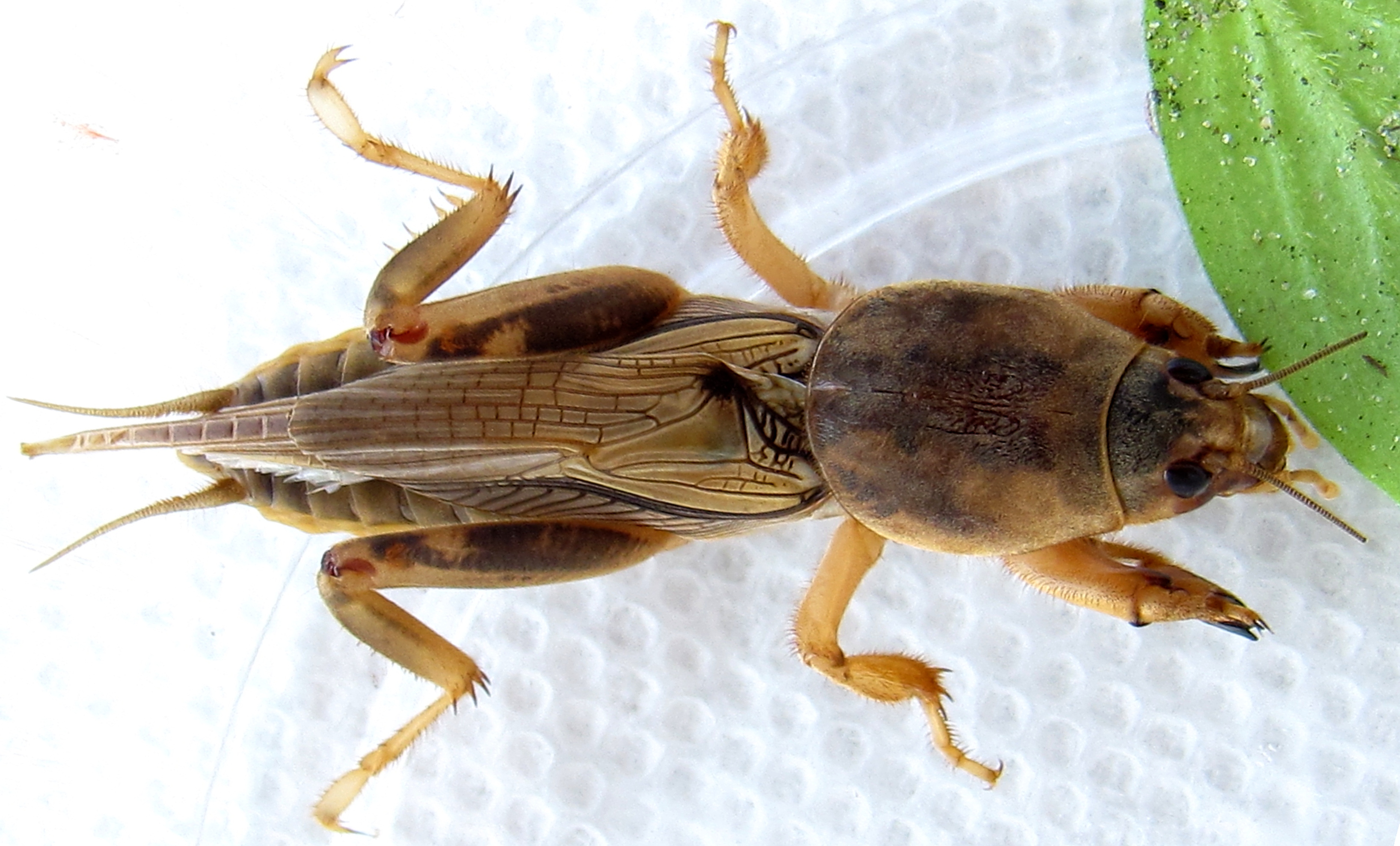

Scientific classification
- Kingdom: Animalia
- Phylum: Arthropoda
- Clade: Pancrustacea
- Class: Insecta
- Order: Orthoptera
- Suborder: Ensifera
- Family: Gryllotalpidae
- Genus: Neoscapteriscus
- Species: N. vicinus

Binomial name
- Neoscapteriscus vicinus (Scudder, 1869)

Synonyms
- Neoscapteriscus agassizii (Scudder, 1869); Scapteriscus vicinus (Scudder, 1869)

= Neoscapteriscus vicinus =

Tawny mole cricket

Species of cricket-like animal

Neoscapteriscus vicinus, commonly known as the tawny mole cricket, is a species of insect in the mole cricket family, Gryllotalpidae. This species is native to South America and also occurs in the Southern United States, where it arrived as a contaminant of ship's ballast around 1900. Colombian insect taxonomist Oscar Cadena-Castañeda studied specimens of the genus which had been called Scapteriscus, and decided that it included two groups; a smaller group (the true Scapteriscus) and a larger group that he named Neoscapteriscus (a new genus) in 2015. North American mole cricket taxonomists agreed with his decision and altered Orthoptera Species File Online accordingly.

== Description ==
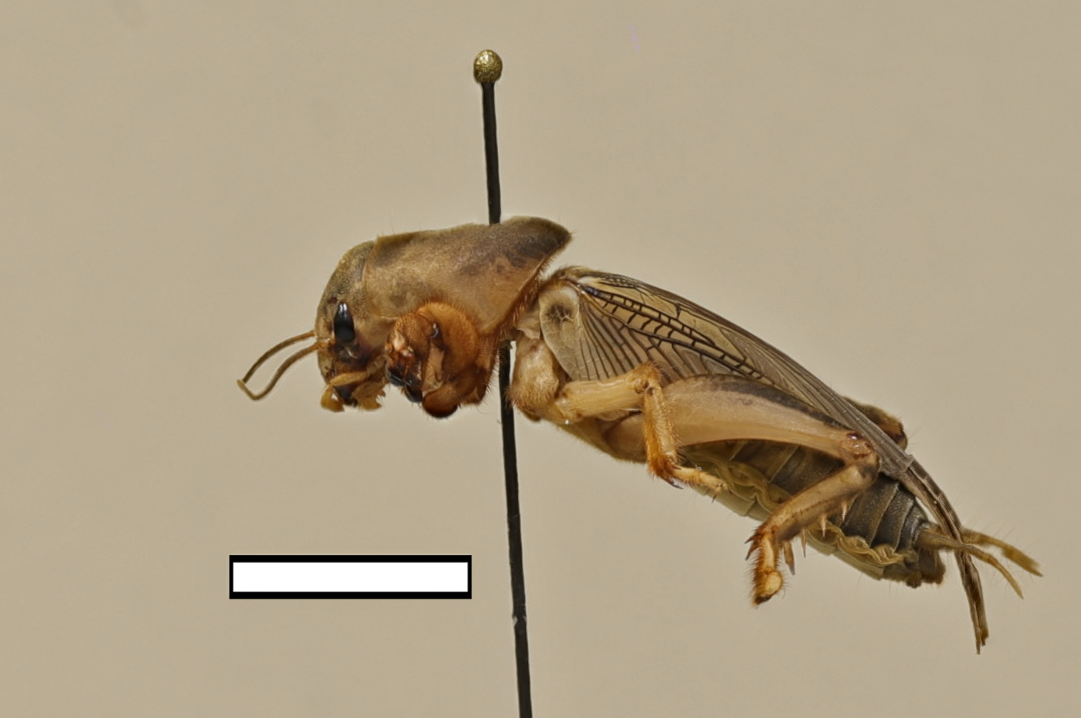
Neoscapteriscus vicinus

N. vicinus is a medium-sized mole cricket. Members of this genus are characterized by having two sharp claws and a blade-like process with a sharp edge on their fore legs. Other mole crickets have three or four claws. Its colour is yellowish-brown with a dark prothorax. It can be differentiated from the rather similar Neoscapteriscus borellii by the two claws that are almost touching at the base, whereas in N. borellii, they are widely separated. The song of N.vicinus, produced only by the males, is a loud trill with a frequency of 130 Hz.

== Distribution and habitat ==
N. vicinus is native to South America. Since arriving in the United States, it has increased its range, which now extends from North Carolina to Louisiana and the whole of Florida, and west to Texas. Though thought of primarily as a pest of turf and grassland, it also damages many crop plants, including tomatoes, strawberries, vegetables, peanuts, sugarcane, tobacco, and ornamental plants.

== Ecology ==
The tawny mole cricket burrows in sandy soil, creating galleries, usually in the upper 25 cm (10 in), the depth depending on the temperature and soil moisture content. In Florida, the adults are active in spring and again in autumn, completing a single lifecycle during the summer and overwintering as a large nymph. N. vicinus is herbivorous and feeds on the roots and young shoots of plants, and also causes damage to plants through its burrowing activities. Breeding takes place in spring and autumn, with the male calling soon after sunset to attract a female. After copulation, the female lays between 25 and 60 eggs in an underground chamber, the entrance to which is then blocked with soil. The eggs hatch about 3 weeks later. The nymphs take several months to develop fully, passing through eight to 10 moults.

In an attempt to reduce the damage done by Neocapteriscus mole crickets in Florida, biological pest control has been attempted using natural enemies introduced from South America. It was considered to have been achieved by 2004, when the program at the University of Florida was shut down. In 2006, a summary publication announced success: a 95% reduction in mole cricket numbers in northern Florida, with biological control agents spreading potentially to all parts of Florida. Larra bicolor is a parasitoid wasp which deposits eggs on adult mole crickets. The fly Ormia depleta acts in a similar manner, laying eggs on them in both cases, the developing larvae devour the tissues of the host. The mole cricket nematode (Steinernema scapterisci) liberates a bacterium which causes sepsis and death to its host mole cricket.

In 2016, a graduate student in economics and her committee published an economic analysis of the entire 25-year biological control program. Part of the balance sheet (input) was salaries and equipment and supplies, and part (output) was reduction in damage by mole crickets to cattle pastures determined by a survey of ranchers throughout Florida. A cost/benefit ratio of 1/52 was calculated. This did not take into account the benefit to turf grass (lawns, playing fields, and golf courses), to vegetable production, or to any areas outside Florida.
