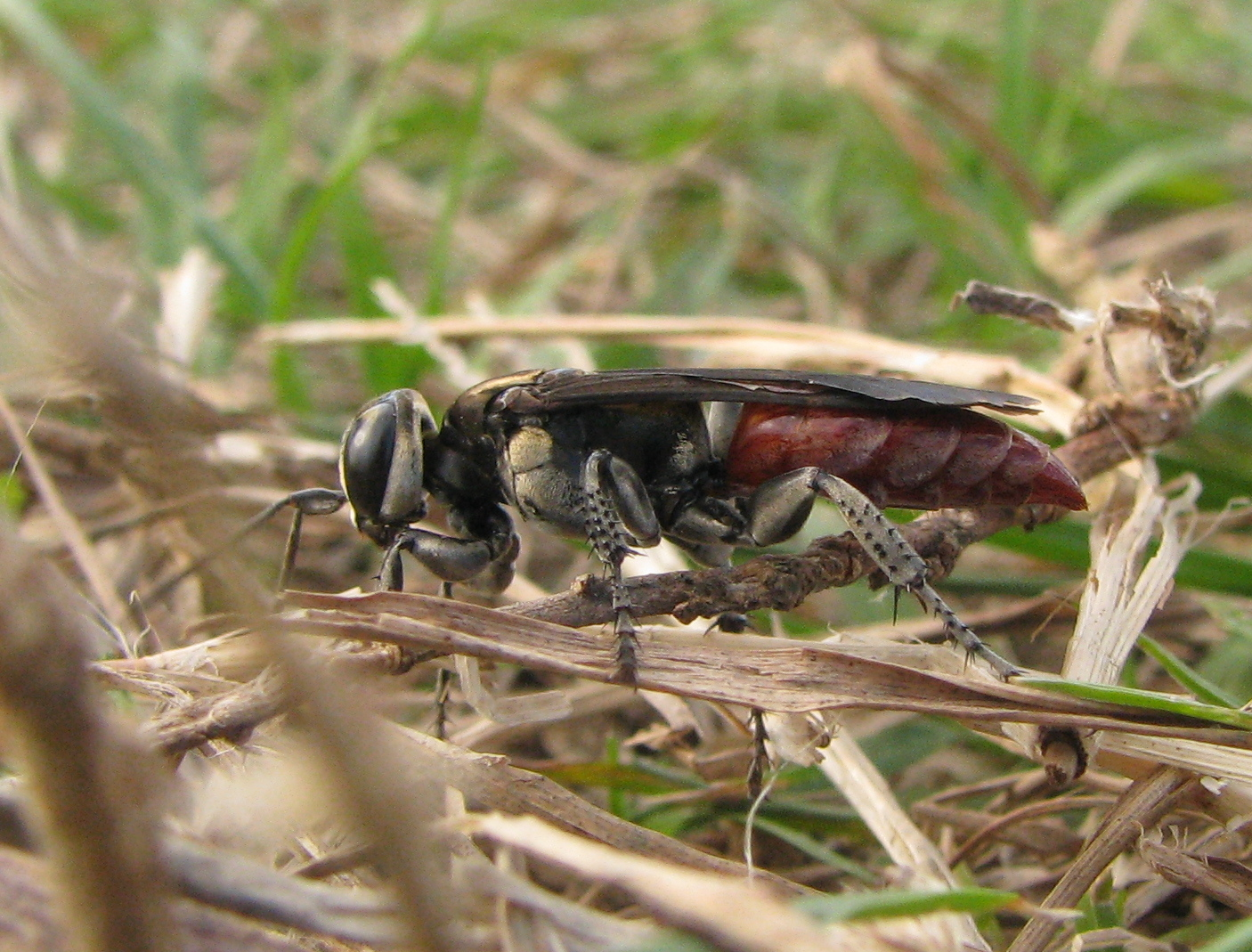

Scientific classification
- Kingdom: Animalia
- Phylum: Arthropoda
- Clade: Pancrustacea
- Class: Insecta
- Order: Hymenoptera
- Family: Crabronidae
- Genus: Larra
- Species: L. bicolor

Binomial name
- Larra bicolor (Fabricius, 1804)

= Larra bicolor =

Species of wasp

Larra bicolor is a parasitoid wasp native to South America. It was introduced into Florida as a biological pest control of invasive mole crickets.

== Description ==
Adult females of this species are about 22 mm long, with the males somewhat smaller. The head and thorax are black, with silver markings on the head; the abdomen is red. The wings are variable in color, of a dusky hue.

== Life cycle ==
These wasps feed on nectar as adults, with the shrubby false buttonweed (Spermacoce verticillata) preferred. Females hunt mole crickets in the genus Scapteriscus, stinging them on the underside to paralyze them for several minutes. A single egg is deposited between the first and second pairs of legs. The wasp then flies off, and the cricket returns to its burrow. Nymphs and adult crickets are attacked, as long as they are large enough.

Upon hatching, the larva feeds upon its host, eventually killing it. It pupates within 12 to 30 days (depending on temperature), forming a cocoon in the remains of the cricket by gluing sand grains together. The pupal phase may be as short as 50 days, but the pupa may enter diapause in the winter, delaying emergence for months. Adults are solitary and do not form nests or colonies.

Other than the winter diapause mentioned above, no seasonal component to wasp activity is known. Several generations of wasps may occur in a year, one of the factors that allow these wasps to out-reproduce their hosts, an important attribute for a successful biological control agent.

== Biological pest control use ==
Non-native mole crickets arrived in Puerto Rico, at least as early as the 18th century, probably by flight, and as early as 1899 in the southeastern United States, probably as contaminants of ship ballast. They became serious pests, damaging crops and pasture- and turfgrasses. Although the related L. analis attacks the native northern mole cricket, it does not attack non-native species. In an early example of biological pest control, L. bicolor was introduced into Puerto Rico in 1938, where it became successfully established. This suggested the possibility of its use on the mainland, but failed attempts and the development of chlordane pesticide in the 1940s brought an end to these efforts.

When chlordane use on food crops was banned in 1978, the Florida legislature inaugurated a program at the University of Florida to find alternative controls for pest mole crickets. Budgetary limitations led to a repetition of the Puerto Rico to the mainland effort, but this population, which originated in Brazil, failed to establish itself except in an area around Fort Lauderdale. Research suggested that these wasps were insufficiently cold-tolerant, and a second effort in 1988–89 used wasps from Bolivia. This introduction was much more successful, and the wasps have gradually spread through most of the state and into neighboring states. They remain highly adapted to the non-native species and have not diversified to attack (for instance) the native northern mole cricket. Also, they are not aggressive, and their sting is reported to be mild compared to more familiar wasps. The principal limitation in their use as a biological control agent has been the need to find appropriate nectar sources for the adults. Some other plants, especially Pentas spp., are also found acceptable; nonetheless, provision of suitable plants is necessary.
