= Steinernema scapterisci =

Scientific classification
- Kingdom: Animalia
- Phylum: Nematoda
- Class: Chromadorea
- Order: Rhabditida
- Family: Steinernematidae
- Genus: Steinernema
- Species: S. scapterisci

Binomial name
- Steinernema scapterisci Nguyen & Smart, 1990

Species of roundworm

Steinernema scapterisci, the mole cricket nematode, is a species of nematode in the order Rhabditida. It is a parasite of insects in the order Orthoptera, the grasshoppers, crickets and their allies. Native to southern South America, it was introduced into Florida in the United States in an effort to provide a biological control of pest (Neoscapteriscus) mole crickets.

A second species of "mole cricket nematode" exists in Florida, and probably elsewhere in the eastern USA. It is now called Steinernema neocurtillae Nguyen, Smart, and is known to attack only the native mole cricket Neocurtilla hexadactyla

== Description ==
Steinernema scapterisci can be distinguished from other species of its genus "by the presence of prominent cheilorhabdions, an elliptically shaped structure associated with the excretory duct, and a double-flapped epitygma in the first-generation female." It does not hybridise with Steinernema carpocapsae, and it infects and kills fewer than 10% of the non-orthopteran insects with which it comes in contact. Larvae of the wax moth, which all other known species of Steinernema infect, are not parasitised by this nematode.

== Distribution ==
Steinernema scapterisci is native to South America, with its range including Argentina, Brazil and Uruguay. It is more tolerant of high temperatures and less tolerant of low temperatures than are other members of its genus.

== Biology ==
Individual adults of S. scapterisci are either male or female and their entire life cycle takes place within the host insect. This comprises an egg stage, four larval stages, the third of which is infective, and an adult stage. Depending on the conditions and the abundance of the parasite, there is either a short life cycle or a long one. The short cycle lasts six to seven days and occurs when the population of nematodes is dense and the availability of nutrients low. In this, the eggs develop through the four larval stages to first generation adults. These mate and the developing larvae become infective in the third juvenile stage. When nutrient availability is high and the nematodes are not overcrowded, the long cycle kicks in. This at first follows a similar course to the short cycle, but the eggs from the first generation adults develop through four larval stages to second generation adults. It is the eggs from these that develop into infectious juveniles. This cycle takes about ten days.

The infectious juveniles can survive in the soil for eight weeks or more. They infect any mole cricket that passes, entering its body through its mouth or spiracles and moving into the hemocoel (body cavity) which is filled with hemolymph. Here they liberate a specialist bacterium, Xenorhabdus innexi; this causes sepsis in the host insect, eventually killing it, but not before the nematode has passed through its various life cycle stages and further infective juveniles have developed. Some fifty thousand infective juveniles may have been released into the soil by each mole cricket host by the time it dies.

== Use in biological control ==
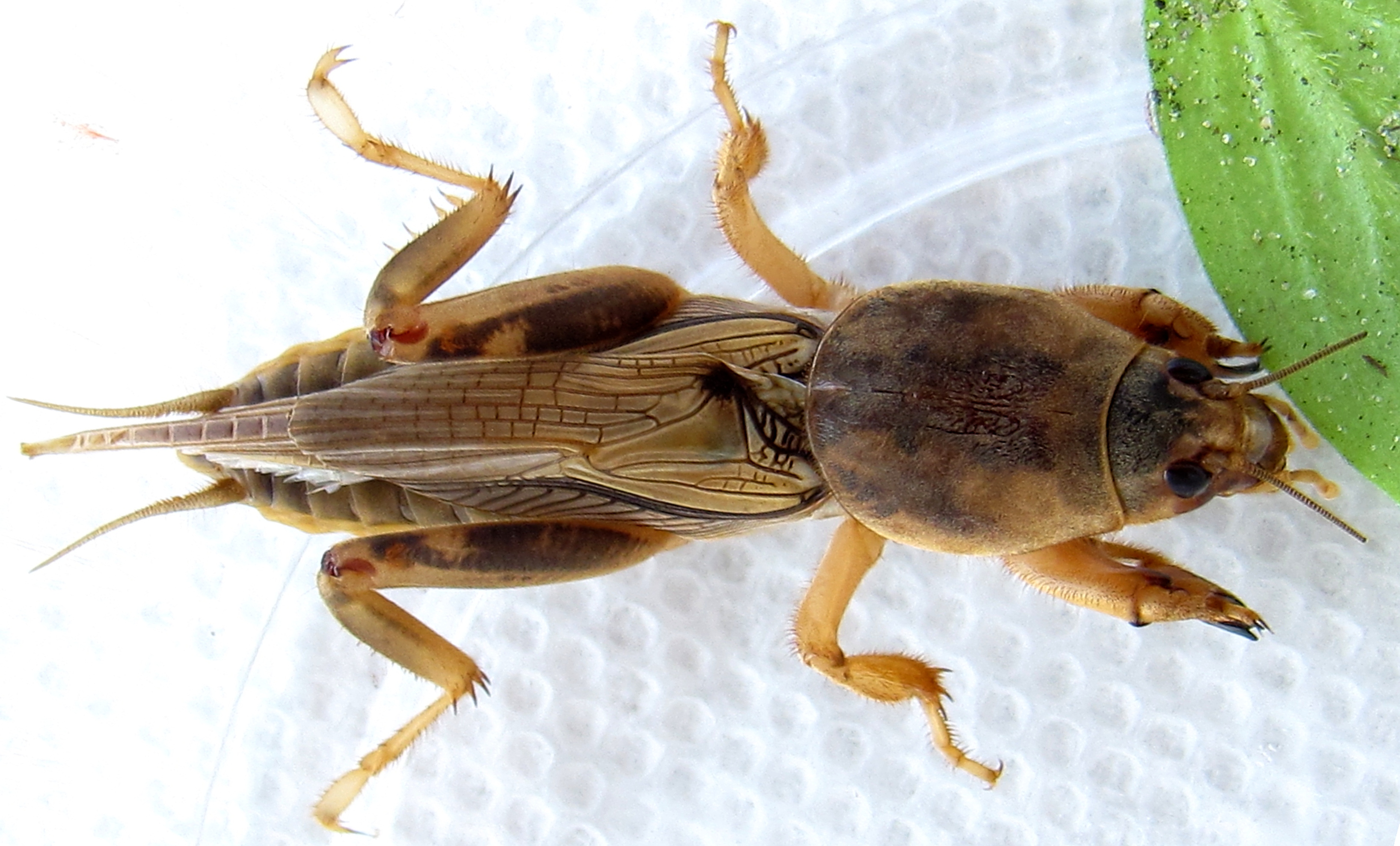
The damage caused by mole crickets in the genus Neoscapteriscus may be controllable using S. scapterisci.

In Florida, mole crickets in the genus Neoscapteriscus did great damage to pastures, lawns and golf courses from the 1930s to 1990s. In 1985, S. scapterisci was released in field trials and successfully infected mole crickets. After infection, the insects remain active and mobile before dying about ten days later. In this time they may disperse by flying, and in Florida three years after being released, the nematodes were found infecting mole crickets more than 20 km (12 mi) from the original release site. In 1990 and 1991, further releases were made on a more widespread scale and S. scapterisci is now established in Florida and was until 2014 available for purchase commercially. By 2004, pest mole cricket populations in Florida had declined by 95% due to action of three parasites, not just Steinernema scapterisci; the others are Ormia depleta (Diptera: Tachinidae) and Larra bicolor (Hymenoptera: Crabronidae).
