= Xenorhabdus bovienii =

Scientific classification
- Domain: Bacteria
- Kingdom: Pseudomonadati
- Phylum: Pseudomonadota
- Class: Gammaproteobacteria
- Order: Enterobacterales
- Family: Morganellaceae
- Genus: Xenorhabdus
- Species: X. bovienii

Binomial name
- Xenorhabdus bovienii Akhurst and Boemare 1993

Type strain
- ACM 2210, Akhurst T228/1, ATCC 35271, CCM 7080, CIP 109144, DSM 4766, LMG 7798, LMG 7800, T 228, T 228/1, UQM 2210

Synonyms
- Xenorhabdus nematophila subsp. bovienii Xenorhabdus nematophilus subsp. bovienii

Species of bacterium

Xenorhabdus bovienii is a bacterium from the genus of Xenorhabdus which has been isolated from the nematodes Steinernema bibionis, Steinernema krsussei, Steinernema affine, Steinernema carpocapsae, Steinernema feltiae, Steinernema intermedium, Steinernema jollieti and Steinernema weiseri. Xenorhabdus bovienii produces N-Butanoylpyrrothine, N-(3-Methylbutanoyl)pyrrothine and Xenocyloins.
