= Xenorhabdus cabanillasii =

Scientific classification
- Domain: Bacteria
- Kingdom: Pseudomonadati
- Phylum: Pseudomonadota
- Class: Gammaproteobacteria
- Order: Enterobacterales
- Family: Morganellaceae
- Genus: Xenorhabdus
- Species: X. cabanillasii

Binomial name
- Xenorhabdus cabanillasii Tailliez et al. 2006

Type strain
- CIP 109066, DSM 17905, USTX62

Species of bacterium

Xenorhabdus cabanillasii is a bacterium from the genus of Xenorhabdus which has been isolated from the nematode Steinernema riobrave in Texas in the United States. Xenorhabdus cabanillasii produces the antifungal metabolite Cabanillasin.
