= Xenorhabdus beddingii =

Scientific classification
- Domain: Bacteria
- Kingdom: Pseudomonadati
- Phylum: Pseudomonadota
- Class: Gammaproteobacteria
- Order: Enterobacterales
- Family: Morganellaceae
- Genus: Xenorhabdus
- Species: X. beddingii

Binomial name
- Xenorhabdus beddingii Akhurst and Boemare 1993

Type strain
- ACM 2871, ATCC 49542, CCM 7079, CIP 109145, DSM 4764, Q 58, Q58/1, UQB 2871, UQM 2871

Synonyms
- Xenorhabdus nematophila subsp. beddingi Xenorhabdus nematophila subsp. beddingii Xenorhabdus nematophilus subsp. beddingii

Species of bacterium

Xenorhabdus beddingii is a bacterium from the genus of Xenorhabdus which has been isolated from the nematode genus Steinernema in Australia and Queensland.
