= Xenorhabdus griffiniae =

Scientific classification
- Domain: Bacteria
- Kingdom: Pseudomonadati
- Phylum: Pseudomonadota
- Class: Gammaproteobacteria
- Order: Enterobacterales
- Family: Morganellaceae
- Genus: Xenorhabdus
- Species: X. griffiniae

Binomial name
- Xenorhabdus griffiniae Tailliez et al. 2006

Type strain
- CIP 109073, DSM 17911, ID10

Species of bacterium

Xenorhabdus griffiniae is a bacterium from the genus of Xenorhabdus which has been isolated from the nematode Steinernema hermaphroditum in Indonesia.
