= Xenorhabdus miraniensis =

Scientific classification
- Domain: Bacteria
- Kingdom: Pseudomonadati
- Phylum: Pseudomonadota
- Class: Gammaproteobacteria
- Order: Enterobacterales
- Family: Morganellaceae
- Genus: Xenorhabdus
- Species: X. miraniensis

Binomial name
- Xenorhabdus miraniensis Tailliez et al. 2006

Type strain
- CIP 109069, DSM 17902, Q1

Species of bacterium

Xenorhabdus miraniensis is a bacterium from the genus Xenorhabdus which has been isolated from a Steinernema species from Mirani in Australia. Xenorhabdus miraniensis produces the antibiotics xenocoumacin and xenorhabdin.
