= Xenorhabdus mauleonii =

Scientific classification
- Domain: Bacteria
- Kingdom: Pseudomonadati
- Phylum: Pseudomonadota
- Class: Gammaproteobacteria
- Order: Enterobacterales
- Family: Morganellaceae
- Genus: Xenorhabdus
- Species: X. mauleonii

Binomial name
- Xenorhabdus mauleonii Tailliez et al. 2006

Type strain
- CIP 109075, DSM 17908, VC01

Species of bacterium

Xenorhabdus mauleonii is a bacterium from the genus Xenorhabdus which has been isolated from an undescribed Steinernema species.
