= Xenorhabdus stockiae =

Scientific classification
- Domain: Bacteria
- Kingdom: Pseudomonadati
- Phylum: Pseudomonadota
- Class: Gammaproteobacteria
- Order: Enterobacterales
- Family: Morganellaceae
- Genus: Xenorhabdus
- Species: X. stockiae

Binomial name
- Xenorhabdus stockiae Tailliez et al. 2006

Type strain
- CIP 109067, DSM 17904, TH01

Species of bacterium

Xenorhabdus stockiae is a bacterium from the genus of Xenorhabdus which has been isolated from the nematode Steinernema siamkayai in Thailand.
