= Xenorhabdus vietnamensis =

Scientific classification
- Domain: Bacteria
- Kingdom: Pseudomonadati
- Phylum: Pseudomonadota
- Class: Gammaproteobacteria
- Order: Enterobacterales
- Family: Morganellaceae
- Genus: Xenorhabdus
- Species: X. vietnamensis

Binomial name
- Xenorhabdus vietnamensis Tailliez et al. 2010

Type strain
- CIP 109945, DSM 22392, VN01

Species of bacterium

Xenorhabdus vietnamensis is a bacterium from the genus Xenorhabdus which has been isolated from the nematode Steinernema sangi in Vietnam.
