= Xenorhabdus ehlersii =

Scientific classification
- Domain: Bacteria
- Kingdom: Pseudomonadati
- Phylum: Pseudomonadota
- Class: Gammaproteobacteria
- Order: Enterobacterales
- Family: Morganellaceae
- Genus: Xenorhabdus
- Species: X. ehlersii

Binomial name
- Xenorhabdus ehlersii Lengyel et al. 2005

Type strain
- CIP 108893, DSM 16337, NCIMB 14018

Species of bacterium

Xenorhabdus ehlersii is a bacterium from the genus of Xenorhabdus which has been isolated from the nematode Steinernema serratum in China.
