= Xenorhabdus japonica =

Scientific classification
- Domain: Bacteria
- Kingdom: Pseudomonadati
- Phylum: Pseudomonadota
- Class: Gammaproteobacteria
- Order: Enterobacterales
- Family: Morganellaceae
- Genus: Xenorhabdus
- Species: X. japonica

Binomial name
- Xenorhabdus japonica Nishimura et al. 1995

Type strain
- IAM 14265, JCM 21111, SK-1

Synonyms
- Xenorhabdus japonicus

Species of bacterium

Xenorhabdus japonica is a bacterium from the genus Xenorhabdus which has been isolated from the nematode Steinernema kushidai in Japan.
