= Xenorhabdus romanii =

Scientific classification
- Domain: Bacteria
- Kingdom: Pseudomonadati
- Phylum: Pseudomonadota
- Class: Gammaproteobacteria
- Order: Enterobacterales
- Family: Morganellaceae
- Genus: Xenorhabdus
- Species: X. romanii

Binomial name
- Xenorhabdus romanii Tailliez et al. 2006

Type strain
- CIP 109070, DSM 17910, PR06-A

Species of bacterium

Xenorhabdus romanii is a bacterium from the genus Xenorhabdus which has been isolated from the nematode Steinernema puertoricense in Puerto Rico.
