= Xenorhabdus hominickii =

Scientific classification
- Domain: Bacteria
- Kingdom: Pseudomonadati
- Phylum: Pseudomonadota
- Class: Gammaproteobacteria
- Order: Enterobacterales
- Family: Morganellaceae
- Genus: Xenorhabdus
- Species: X. hominickii

Binomial name
- Xenorhabdus hominickii Tailliez et al. 2006

Type strain
- CIP 109072, DSM 17903, KE01

Species of bacterium

Xenorhabdus hominickii is a bacterium from the genus of Xenorhabdus which has been isolated from the nematodes Steinernema karii in Kenya and Steinernema monticolum from Korea.
