= Xenorhabdus indica =

Scientific classification
- Domain: Bacteria
- Kingdom: Pseudomonadati
- Phylum: Pseudomonadota
- Class: Gammaproteobacteria
- Order: Enterobacterales
- Family: Morganellaceae
- Genus: Xenorhabdus
- Species: X. indica

Binomial name
- Xenorhabdus indica Somvanshi et al. 2009

Type strain
- 28, CCM 7375, CIP 108830, DSM 17382

Species of bacterium

Xenorhabdus indica is a bacterium from the genus of Xenorhabdus which has been isolated from the nematodes Steinernema thermophilum and Steinernema yirgalemense. Xenorhabdus indica produces the Taxlllaids A–G.
