= Steinernema xueshanense =

Scientific classification
- Domain: Eukaryota
- Kingdom: Animalia
- Phylum: Nematoda
- Class: Chromadorea
- Order: Rhabditida
- Family: Steinernematidae
- Genus: Steinernema
- Species: S. xueshanense

Binomial name
- Steinernema xueshanense Mracek, Liu & Nguyen, 2009

Species of roundworm

Steinernema xueshanense is a nematode species from the genus of Steinernema. Steinernema xueshanense is named after the Xue Shan mountains.
