= Xenorhabdus poinarii =

Scientific classification
- Domain: Bacteria
- Kingdom: Pseudomonadati
- Phylum: Pseudomonadota
- Class: Gammaproteobacteria
- Order: Enterobacterales
- Family: Morganellaceae
- Genus: Xenorhabdus
- Species: X. poinarii

Binomial name
- Xenorhabdus poinarii (Akhurst 1983) Akhurst and Boemare 1993

Type strain
- ACM 2216, ATCC 35272, CCM 3687, CIP 103468, DSM 4768, G1, UQM 2216

Synonyms
- Xenorhabdus nematophila subsp. poinarii Xenorhabdus nematophilus subsp. poinarii

Species of bacterium

Xenorhabdus poinarii is a bacterium from the genus Xenorhabdus which has been isolated from the nematodes Steinernema glaseri and Steinernema cubanum.
