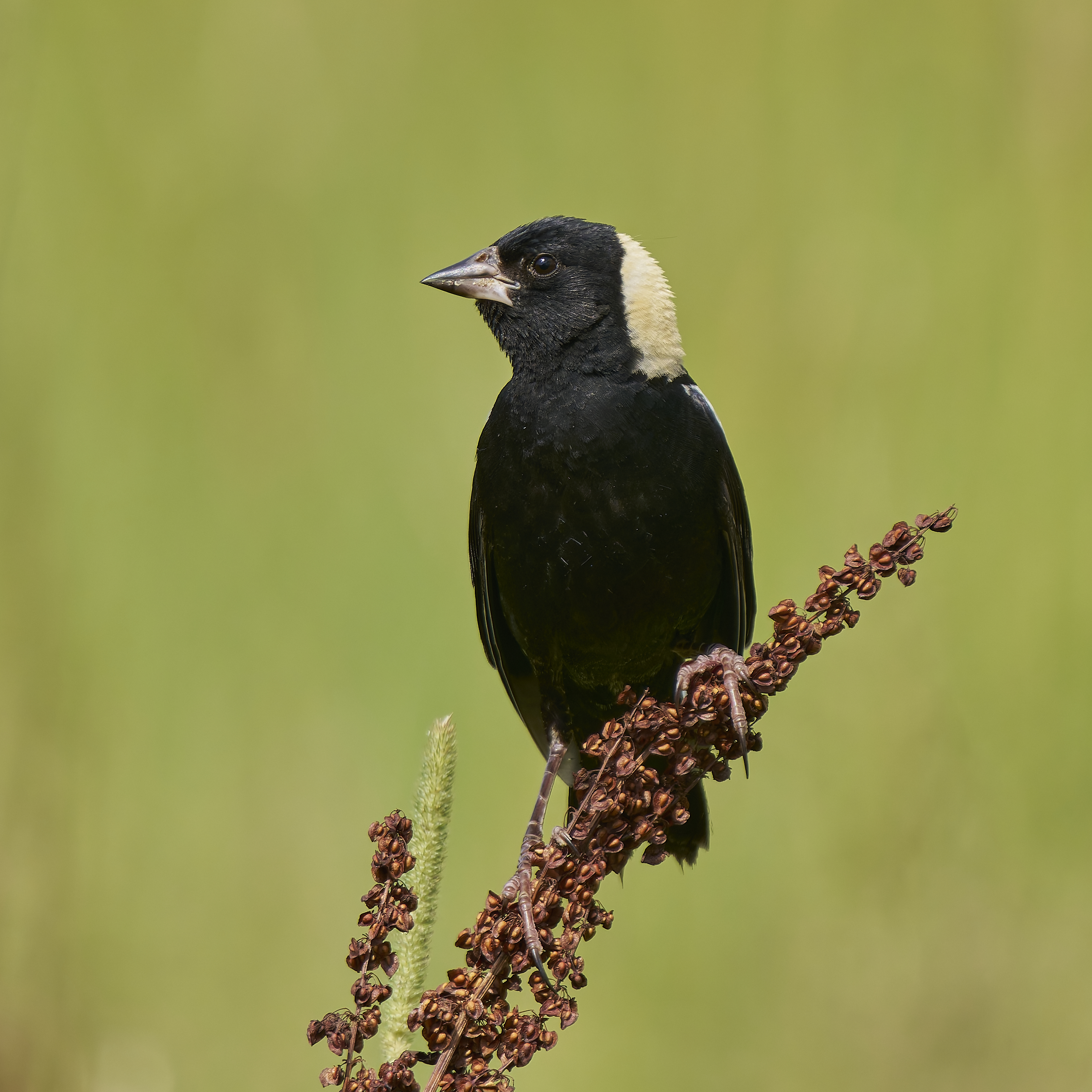
- Adult male

Conservation status
- Near Threatened (IUCN 3.1)

Scientific classification
- Kingdom: Animalia
- Phylum: Chordata
- Class: Aves
- Order: Passeriformes
- Family: Icteridae
- Genus: Dolichonyx; Swainson, 1827
- Species: D. oryzivorus

Binomial name
- Dolichonyx oryzivorus (Linnaeus, 1758)
- Approximate distribution. Breeding range Non-breeding range

Synonyms
- Fringilla oryzivora Linnaeus, 1758; Emberiza oryzivora Linnaeus, 1766

= Bobolink =

Bobolink Temporal range: Pleistocene–present

Species of bird

The bobolink (Dolichonyx oryzivorus) is a small New World blackbird and the only member of the genus Dolichonyx. An old name for this species is the "rice bird", from its tendency to feed on cultivated grains during winter and migration. The bobolink breeds in the summer in the United States and Canada, with most of the summer range in the northern U.S. Bobolinks winter in southern South America, primarily Paraguay, Argentina, and Bolivia. Bobolink numbers are rapidly declining due to factors such as agricultural intensification and habitat loss; they are considered threatened in Canada, and are at risk throughout their range.

== Taxonomy ==
The bobolink was formally described in 1758 by the Swedish naturalist Carl Linnaeus in the tenth edition of his Systema Naturae. He placed it with the finches in the genus Fringilla and coined the binomial name Fringilla oryzivora. Linnaeus mainly based his account on "The Rice-Bird" that had been described and illustrated in 1729 by the English naturalist Mark Catesby in his book The Natural History of Carolina, Florida and the Bahama Islands. Linnaeus specified the type locality as "Cuba ... in Carolinam" but this was restricted to the state of South Carolina by the American Ornithologists' Union in 1931. The bobolink is now the only species placed in the genus Dolichonyx that was introduced in 1827 by the English zoologist William Swainson. The genus name combines the Ancient Greek δολιχος/dolikhos meaning "long" with ονυξ/onux, ονυχος/onukhos meaning "claw" or "nail". The specific epithet oryzivorus combines the Latin oryza meaning "rice" with -vorus meaning "eating". The English name "bobolink" is from Bob o' Lincoln, describing the call. The species is considered to be monotypic: no subspecies are recognised.

== Description ==
Measurements:

- Length: 5.9–8.3 in (15–21 cm)
- Weight: 1.0–2.0 oz (28–57 g)
- Wingspan: 10.6 inches (27 cm)

Adults are 16–18 cm (6.3–7.1 in) long with short finch-like bills and weigh about 28 g (1 oz). Adult males are mostly black with creamy napes and white scapulars, lower backs, and rumps. Adult females are mostly light brown with black streaks on the back and flanks, and dark stripes on the head; their wings and tails are darker.

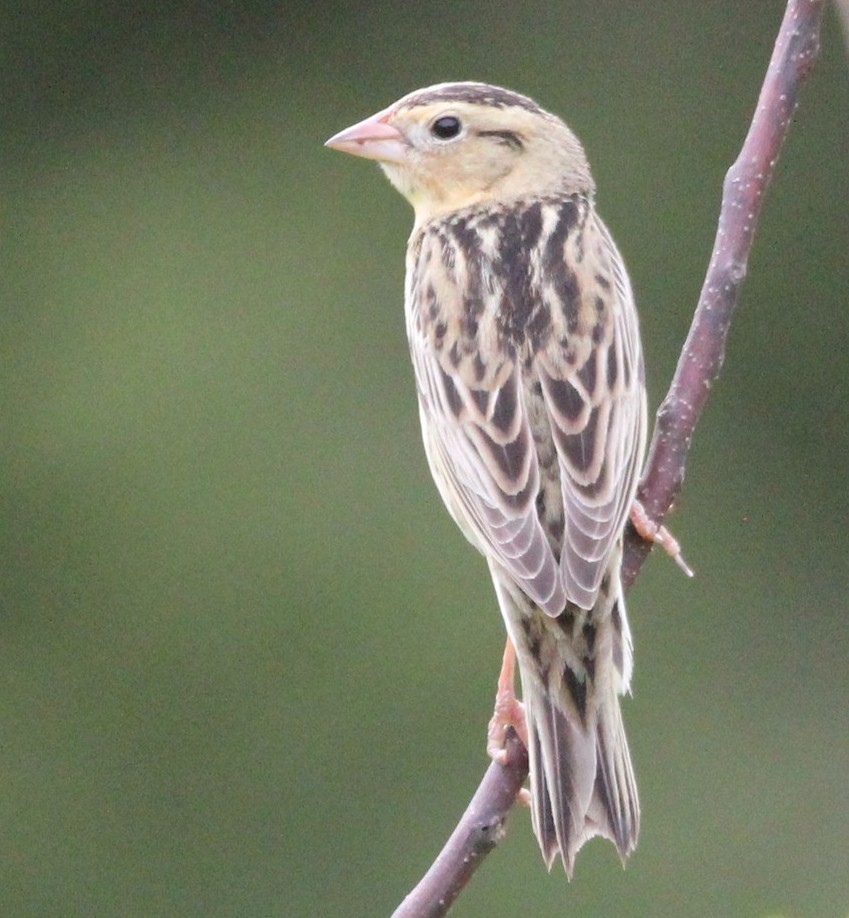
Female

== Distribution and movements ==
The bobolink breeds in the summer in North America across much of southern Canada and the northern United States; from 1966 to 2015 the species experienced a greater than 1.5% annual population decrease throughout most of its breeding range, extending from the Midwestern United States to the Canadian Maritimes. The bobolink migrates long distances, wintering in southern South America. One bird was tracked migrating 12,000 mi (19,000 km) over the course of the year, often flying long distances up to 1,100 mi (1,800 km) in a single day, then stopping to recuperate for days or weeks.

Bobolinks often migrate in flocks, feeding on cultivated grains and rice, which leads to them being considered a pest by farmers in some areas. Although bobolinks migrate long distances, they have rarely been sighted in Europe—like many vagrants from the Americas, the majority of records are from the British Isles.

The species has been known in the southern United States as the "reedbird", or the "ricebird" from their consumption of large amounts of the grain from rice fields in South Carolina and the Gulf States during their southward migration in the fall. One of the species' main migration routes is through Jamaica, where they are called "butter-birds" and at least historically were collected as food, having fattened up on the aforementioned rice.

Bobolinks are the only species of land bird known to annually migrate through the Galápagos Islands, which are over 2,000 km (1,200 mi) from their primary migration route. A bobolink was collected in the Galápagos Islands by Charles Darwin in 1835. Bobolinks have been hypothesized to act as vectors for avian malaria-causing parasites arriving in the Islands. Additionally, bobolinks in the Galápagos have been found with seeds from Drymaria cordata, a plant native to the Galápagos but highly invasive elsewhere, entangled in their feathers, potentially spreading them to the mainland.

== Behaviour ==
=== Breeding ===
Bobolinks historically nested in tallgrass and mixed-grass prairies of the Great Plains of the United States and Canada. Since the development of these habitats, modern breeding habitats includes open grassy fields, especially hay fields, across the northern half of North America. In high-quality habitats, males are often polygynous. Females construct their cup-shaped ground nests alone, and lay three to seven eggs. Both parents feed the young, with polygynous males providing food to multiple nests.

=== Feeding ===
Bobolinks forage on or near the ground and mainly eat seeds and insects. They are nicknamed the "armyworm bird" because of their predation on large numbers of armyworms, including the true armyworm (Mythimna unipuncta) and the fall armyworm (Spodoptera frugiperda), acting as a natural pest control. In Florida, bobolinks feed most often on the Fall armyworm rather than the True armyworm, as the former is more common in the region.

=== Calls ===
Males have two song types, which they will sing both alone and together to make compound songs. Males sing both while perching and in flight, but compound songs are more likely during flight. The song of the male bobolink is difficult to convey phonetically, with Arthur Bent writing:

"No description of the song of the bobolink is adequate to convey to the reader who has not heard it any appreciation of its beauty and vivacity. It is unique among bird songs, the despair of the recorder or the imitator; even the famed mockingbird cannot reproduce it. It is a bubbling delirium of ecstatic music that flows from the gifted throat of the bird like sparkling champagne."

Nine additional call notes have been described, several of which are unique to female bobolinks, including a whining solicitation call and a "quipt" defense call.

== Status and conservation ==
During the 1800s the bobolink, like many birds, was slaughtered in large numbers for the meat trade.

The numbers of these birds are declining due to loss of habitat. Bobolinks are a species at risk in Nova Scotia, and throughout Canada. In Vermont, a 75% decline was noted between 1966 and 2007. Originally, they were found in tallgrass prairie and other open areas with dense grass. Although hay fields are suitable nesting habitats, fields which are harvested early, or at multiple times, in a season may not allow sufficient time for young birds to fledge. Delaying hay harvests by just 1.5 weeks can improve bobolink survival by 20%. This species increased in numbers when horses were the primary mode of transportation, requiring larger supplies of hay.

A 2021 study found that the reintroduction of American bison across the United States was detrimental to bobolink populations, with adult populations dropping as much as 62% and juvenile populations as much as 84%. This is presumed to be due to many new bison herds being managed more as livestock than wildlife, often kept in fenced pastures and protected from predation, which encourages overgrazing, trampling, and rapid multiplying. The study also found that lighter grazing by bison did not have the same harmful effects, demonstrating that the two species could likely coexist under the right circumstances.

== Media references ==
Emily Dickinson penned many poems about or mentioning the bird. Edgar Allan Poe mentions the bird in "Landor's Cottage". William Cullen Bryant wrote about the bob-o'-link in his poem "Robert of Lincoln".

The bobolink is mentioned in the song "Evelina" by Harold Arlen and Yip Harburg, from the musical Bloomer Girl:

Evelina, won't ya ever take a shine to that moon?
Evelina, ain't ya bothered by the Bobolink's tune?

The bird is also one of the many important ornithological references in the poem "Pale Fire" by the fictional poet John Shade, part of Vladimir Nabokov's novel of the same name.

Sophie Jewett ends her poem "An Exile's Garden" (1910) with a reference to a bobolink.

Baseball partners Robert Leadley and Bob Glenalvin purchased the Western League (1885–1899) Grand Rapids baseball franchise from George E. Ellis in 1897 and renamed it the Bob-o-links.

== Gallery ==
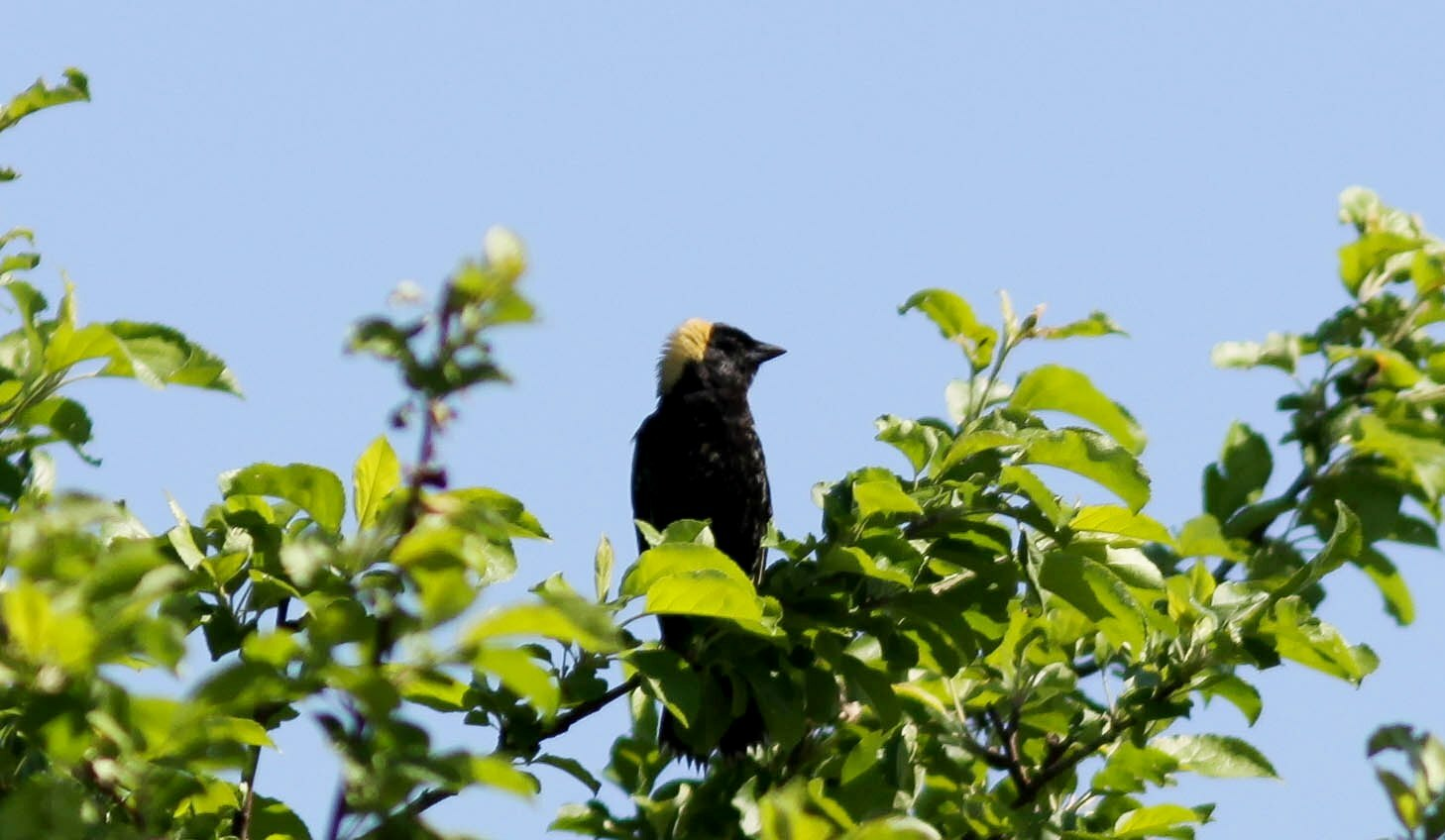
Male, New England, United States

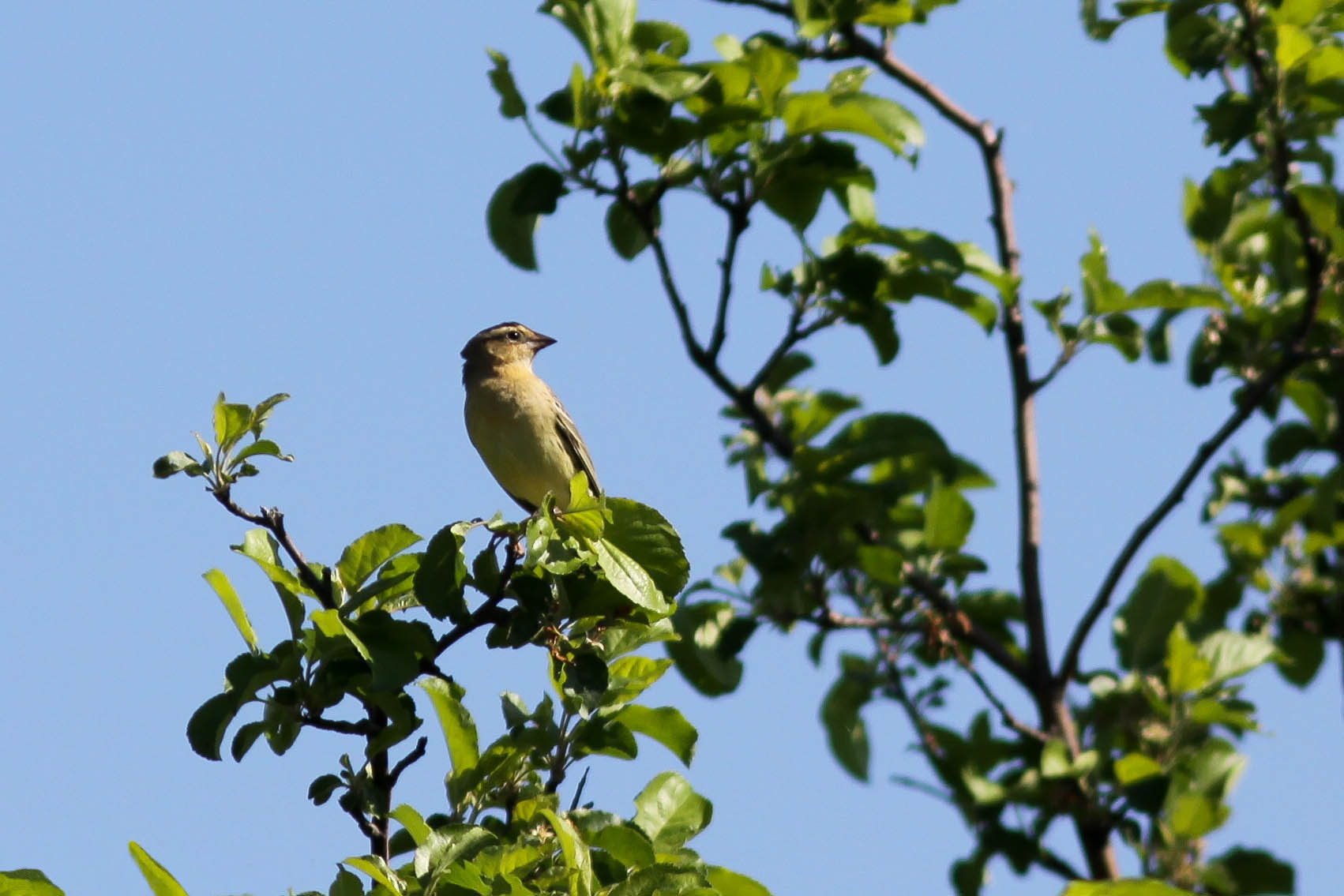
Female, New England, United States

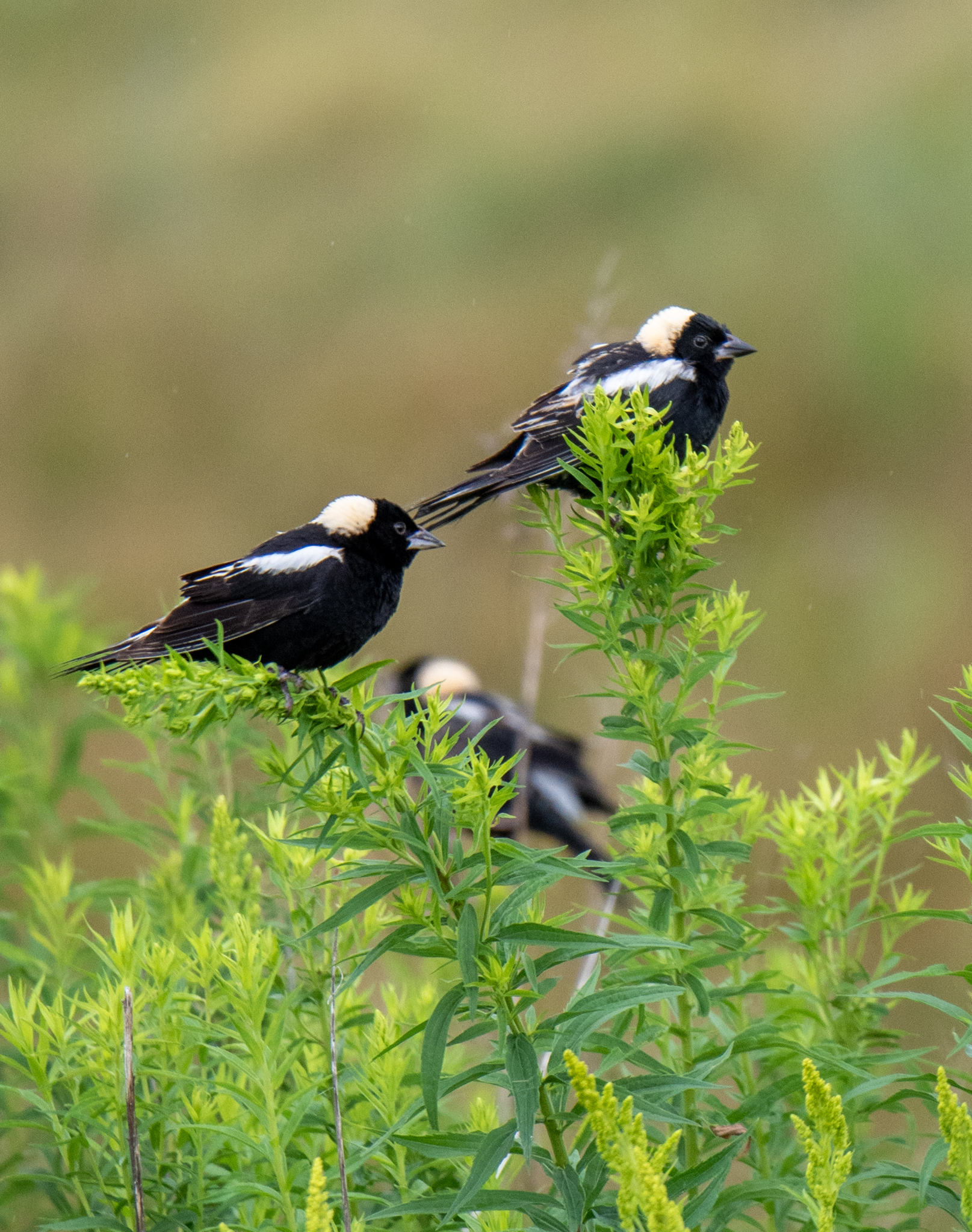
Males – Maine

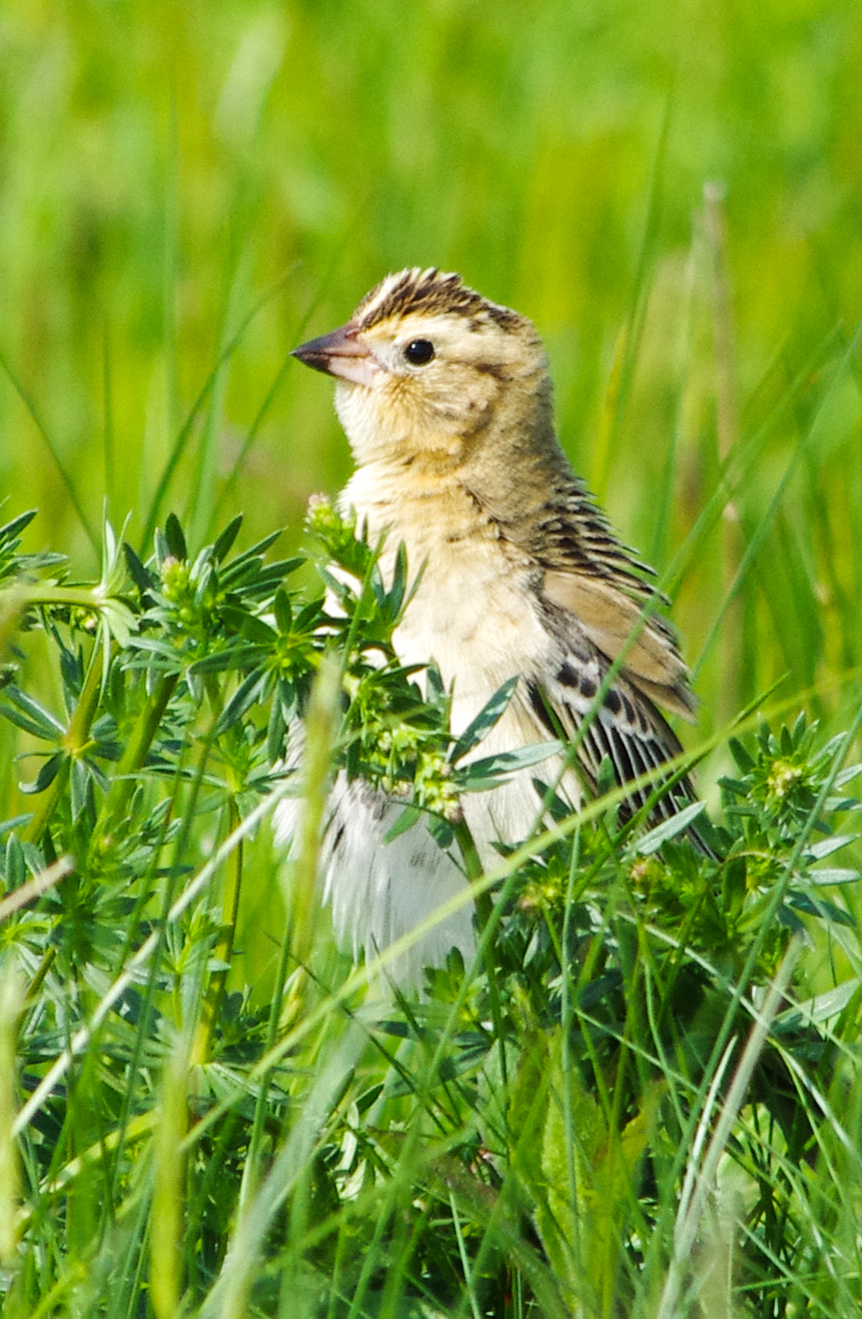
Female – Maine

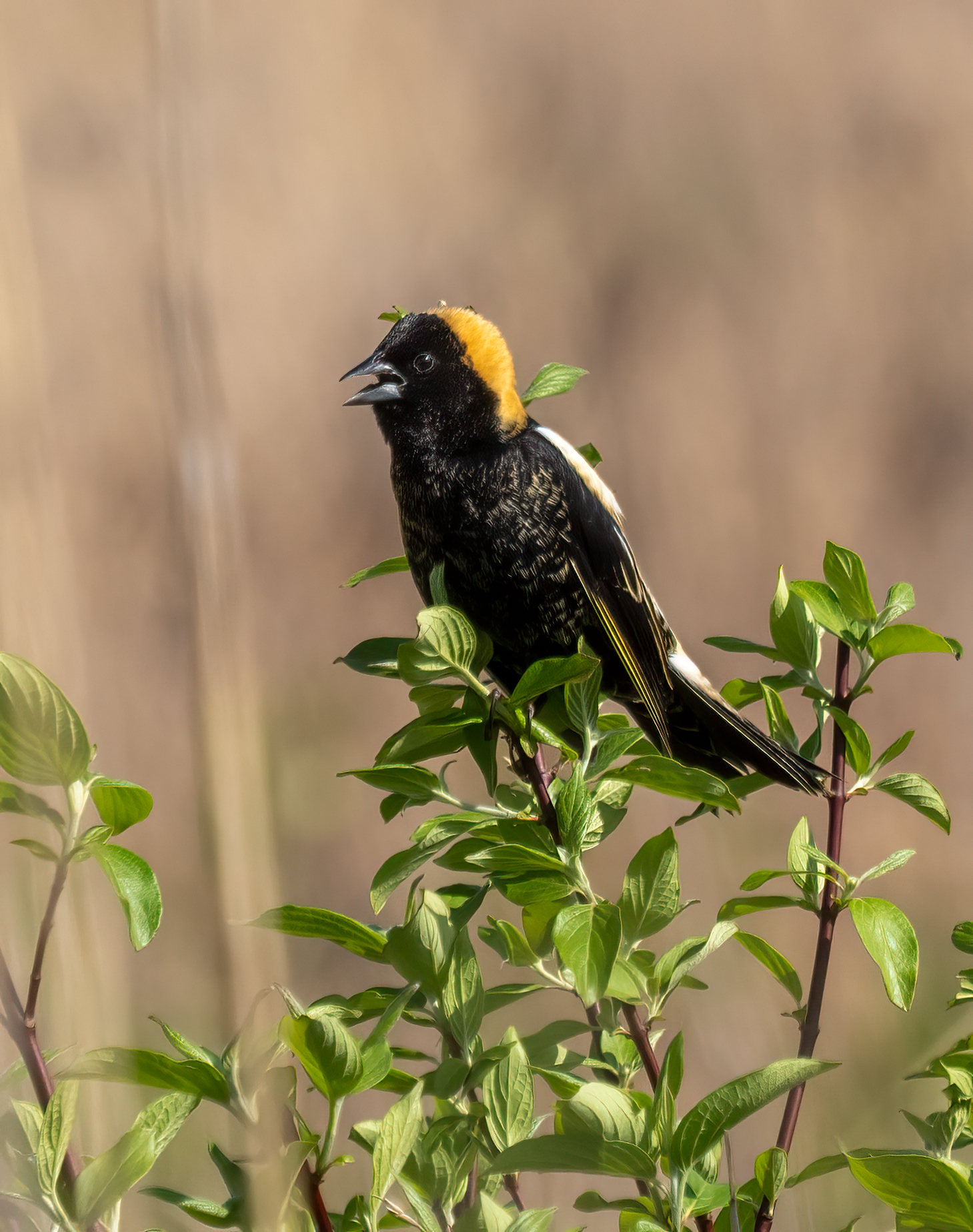
Male singing in New York

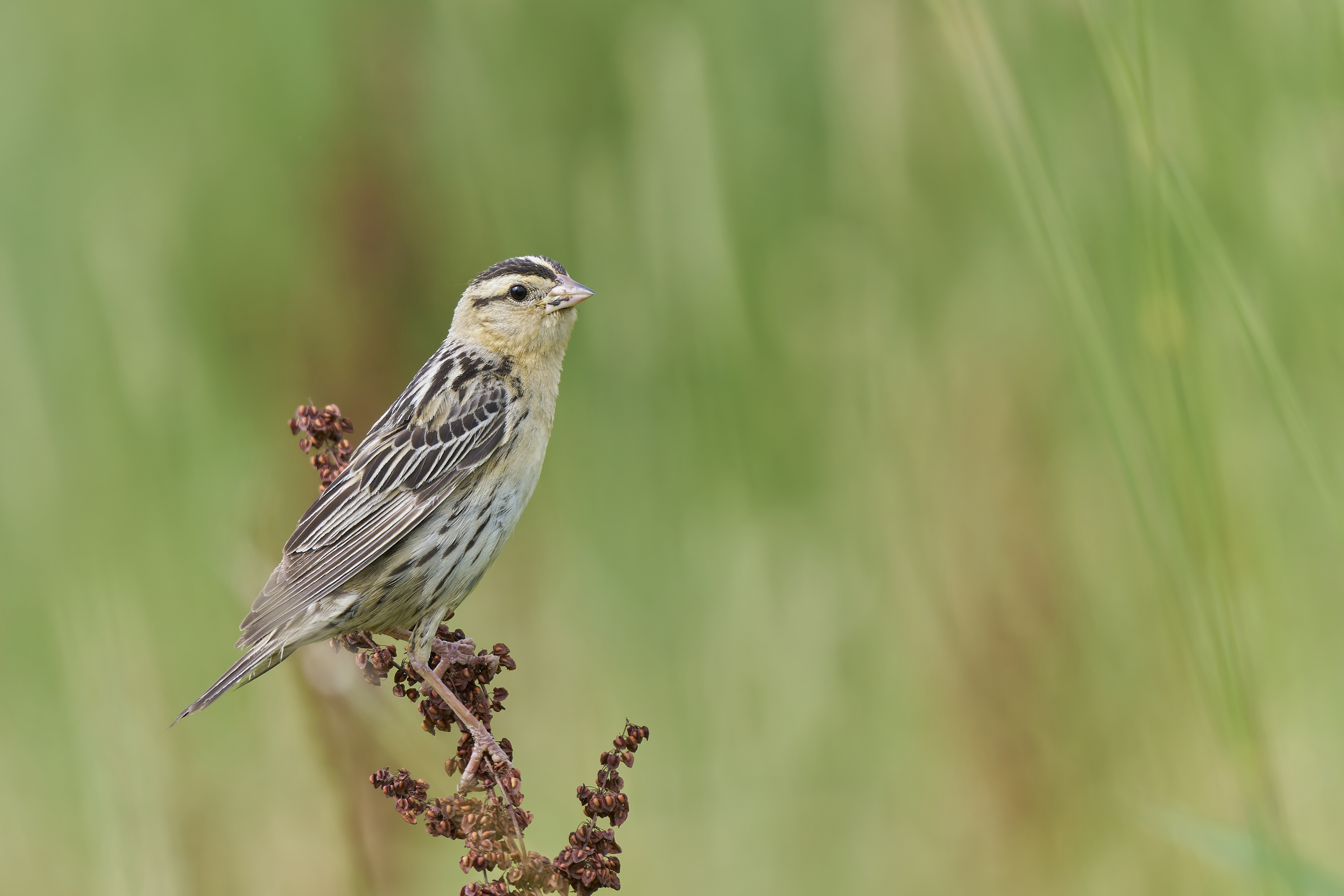
Juvenile, Connecticut, US

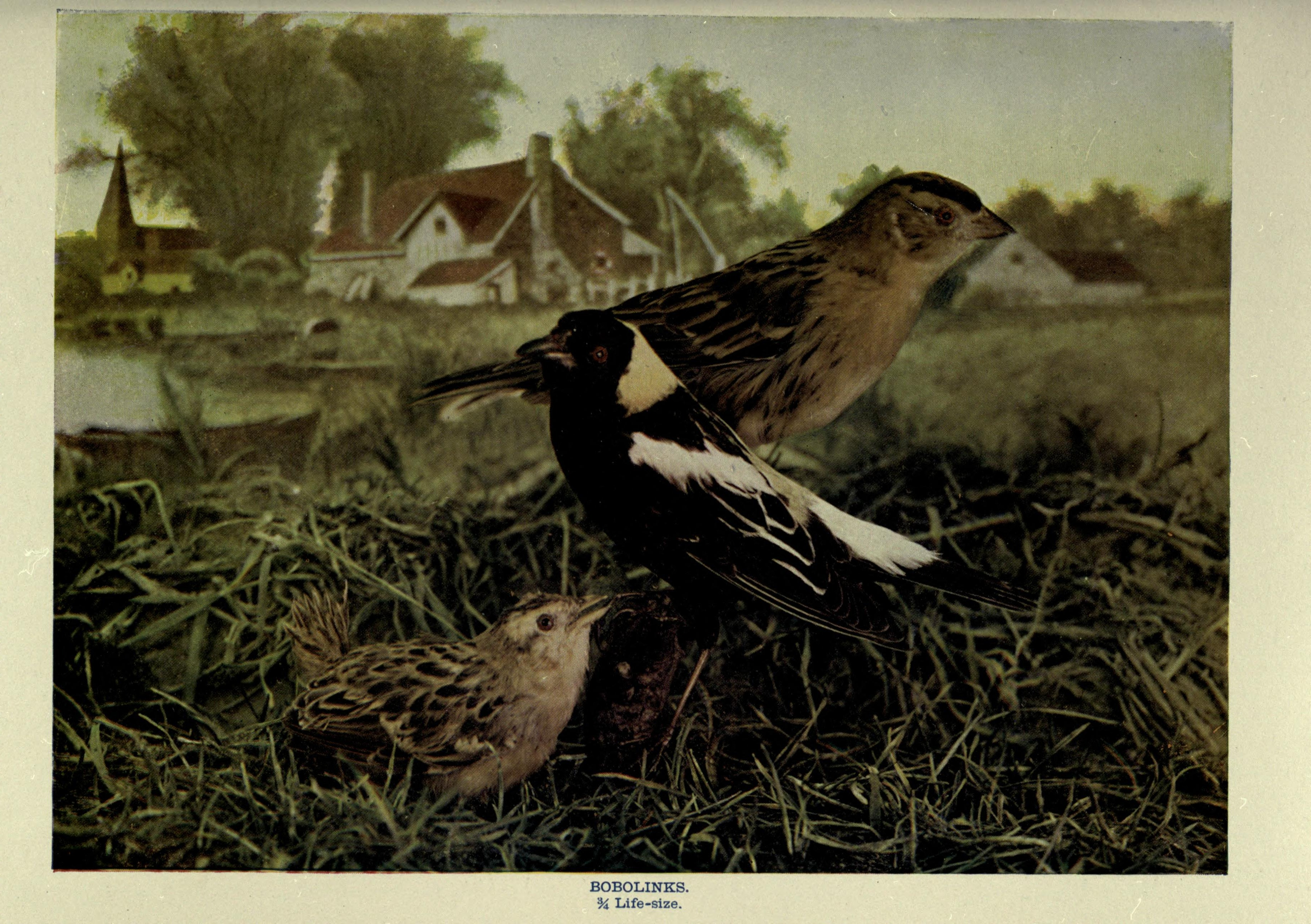
Bobolink — chromolithograph from Bird Neighbors (1897)
