= Xenorhabdus koppenhoeferi =

Scientific classification
- Domain: Bacteria
- Kingdom: Pseudomonadati
- Phylum: Pseudomonadota
- Class: Gammaproteobacteria
- Order: Enterobacterales
- Family: Morganellaceae
- Genus: Xenorhabdus
- Species: X. koppenhoeferi

Binomial name
- Xenorhabdus koppenhoeferi Tailliez et al. 2006

Type strain
- CIP 109199, DSM 18168, USNJ01

Species of bacterium

Xenorhabdus koppenhoeferi is a bacterium from the genus Xenorhabdus which has been isolated from the nematode Steinernema scarabaei in the United States.
