= Xenorhabdus ishibashii =

Scientific classification
- Domain: Bacteria
- Kingdom: Pseudomonadati
- Phylum: Pseudomonadota
- Class: Gammaproteobacteria
- Order: Enterobacterales
- Family: Morganellaceae
- Genus: Xenorhabdus
- Species: X. ishibashii

Binomial name
- Xenorhabdus ishibashii Kuwata et al. 2013

Type strain
- CGMCC 1.9166, DSM 22670, GDh7

Species of bacterium

Xenorhabdus ishibashii is a species of Gram-negative bacteria belonging to the genus Xenorhabdus which has been isolated from the nematode Steinernema aciari collected in the Guangdong Province in China and in Japan.

== Taxonomy ==
Xenorhabdus ishibashii belongs to the family Morganellaceae within the order Enterobacterales. The species was formally described in 2013 based on phenotypic characteristics and molecular phylogenetic analyses.

== Discovery and description ==
The species was first isolated from entomopathogenic nematodes of the genus Steinernema, collected in Japan and China. Phylogenetic analyses based on 16S rRNA gene sequences and multilocus sequence analysis demonstrated that the isolates represented a novel species within the genus Xenorhabdus.

== Morphology and physiology ==
Xenorhabdus ishibashii is a Gram-negative, rod-shaped, motile bacterium. It is a facultative anaerobe, mesophilic, and does not form spores. Its physiological characteristics are consistent with those of other members of the genus Xenorhabdus.

== Ecology ==
Species of the genus Xenorhabdus exist in an obligate mutualistic relationship with nematodes of the genus Steinernema. The bacteria are carried by infective juvenile nematodes and are released into the insect hemocoel during infection, where they proliferate and contribute to host death.

== Host interactions ==
The association between Xenorhabdus bacteria and Steinernema nematodes is mutually beneficial. The bacteria produce toxins and antimicrobial compounds that suppress the insect immune system and inhibit competing microorganisms, while the nematodes serve as vectors for bacterial transmission.

== Genetics ==
Phylogenetic analyses based on 16S rRNA gene sequences indicate that Xenorhabdus ishibashii is genetically distinct from closely related species within the genus. Multilocus sequence analysis further supports its classification as a separate species.

== Significance ==
Members of the genus Xenorhabdus are of scientific interest due to their ability to produce insecticidal and antimicrobial secondary metabolites. These properties make them potential candidates for biological pest control and a source of novel bioactive compounds.
