= Xenorhabdus innexi =

Scientific classification
- Domain: Bacteria
- Kingdom: Pseudomonadati
- Phylum: Pseudomonadota
- Class: Gammaproteobacteria
- Order: Enterobacterales
- Family: Morganellaceae
- Genus: Xenorhabdus
- Species: X. innexi

Binomial name
- Xenorhabdus innexi Lengyel et al. 2005

Type strain
- CIP 108894, DSM 16336, NCIMB 14017

Species of bacterium

Xenorhabdus innexi is a bacterium from the genus of Xenorhabdus which has been isolated from the nematode Steinernema scapterisci in Uruguay.
