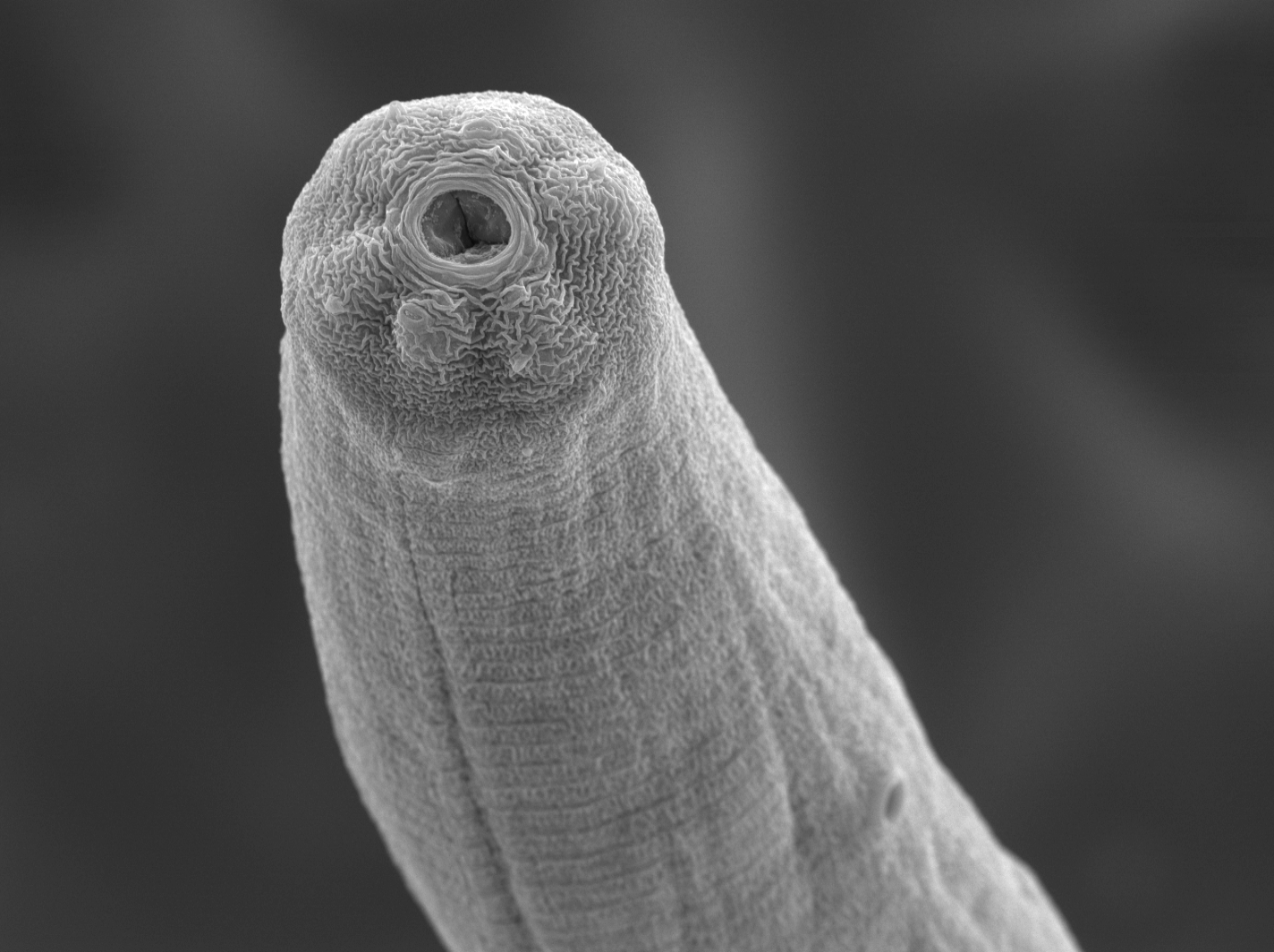
- An activated Steinernema carpocapsae infective juvenile nematode.

Scientific classification
- Kingdom: Animalia
- Phylum: Nematoda
- Class: Chromadorea
- Order: Rhabditida
- Family: Steinernematidae
- Genus: Steinernema
- Species: S. carpocapsae

Binomial name
- Steinernema carpocapsae (Weiser, 1955)

= Steinernema carpocapsae =

Species of roundworm

Steinernema carpocapsae is an entomopathogenic nematode and a member of the family Steinernematidae. It is a parasitic roundworm that has evolved an insect-killing symbiosis with bacteria, and kills its hosts within a few days of infection. This parasite releases its bacterial symbiont along with a variety of proteins into the host after infection, and together the bacteria and nematode overcome host immunity and kill the host quickly. As a consequence, S. carpocapsae has been widely adapted for use as a biological control agent in agriculture and pest control. S. carpocapsae is considered a generalist parasite and has been effectively used to control a variety of insects including: Webworms, cutworms, armyworms, girdlers, some weevils, and wood-borers. This species is an example of an "ambush" forager, standing on its tail in an upright position near the soil surface and attaching to passing hosts, even capable of jumping. As an ambush forager, S. carpocapsae is thought to be especially effective when applied against highly mobile surface-adapted insects (though some below-ground insects are also controlled by this nematode). S. carpocapsae can sense carbon dioxide production, making the spiracles a key portal of entry into its insect hosts. It is most effective at temperatures ranging from 22–28 °C (72–82 °F) .

== Lifecycle ==
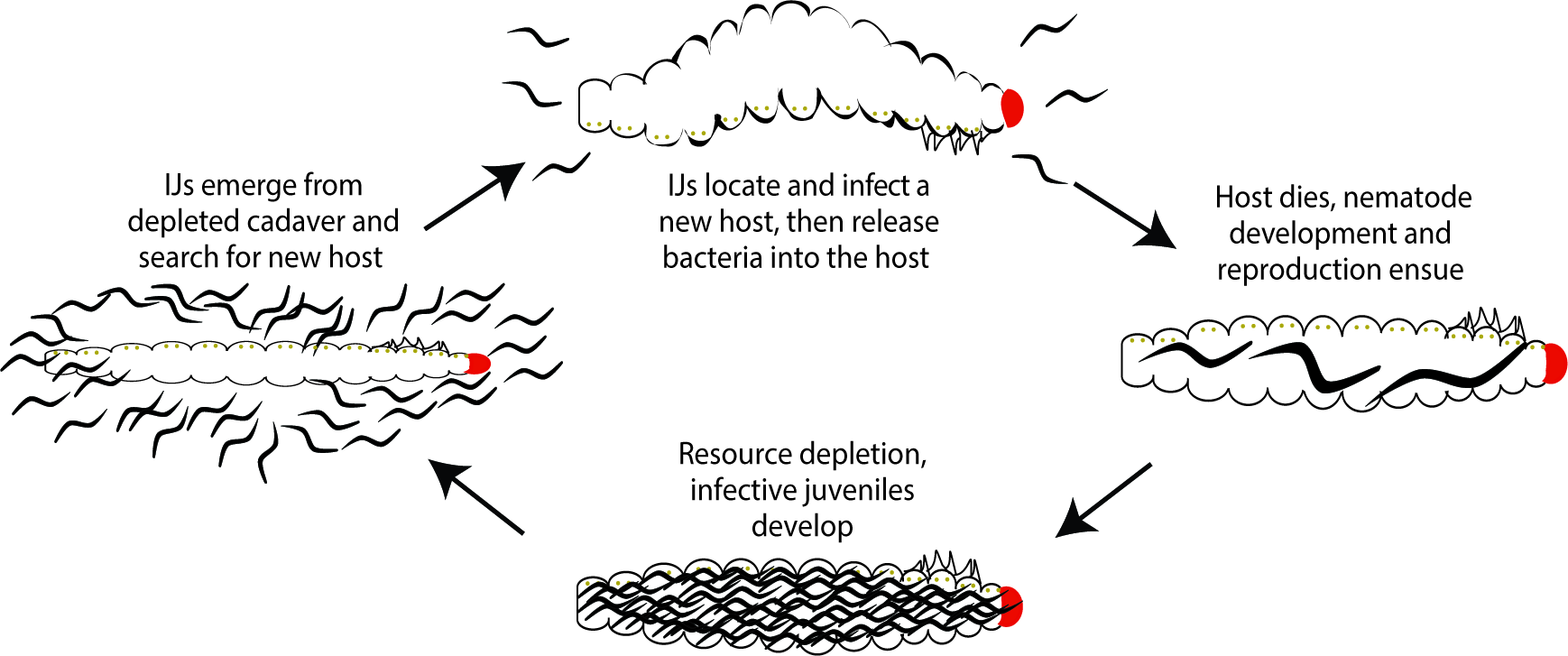
A general life cycle of entomopathogenic nematodes

Steinernema carpocapsae is categorized as an entomopathogenic nematode, which is a specialized subgroup of insect-parasitic nematodes. The infective juvenile stage (IJ) is a modified third stage larva and is the only free-living stage of this nematode. It is a developmentally arrested, non-feeding stage, that seeks out an insect host to infect. All other life stages (L1, L2, L3, L4, and adult) occur within an insect host. The IJ enters the host through natural openings such as the spiracles, mouth, anus, or in some species through intersegmental membranes of the cuticle, and then enters into the hemocoel. S. carpocapsae are mutualistically associated with the bacterium Xenorhabdus nematophila. When the IJ stage enters the host, it initiates the actively parasitic part of its lifecycle. This process includes the resumption of development, and the release of their symbiotic bacteria and a variety of nematode-derived proteins into the hemocoel. Though the X. nematophila bacteria is carried by the IJ in a specialized structure in the anterior gut called the receptacle, it is released into the host through defecation. The bacteria multiply in the insect hemolymph and the infected host usually dies within 24 to 48 hours. After the death of the host, nematodes continue to feed on the host tissue and the multiplying bacteria. They develop into males and females and reproduce. The progeny develop through four juvenile stages to the adult. Depending on the available resources, one or more generations may occur within the host cadaver and a large number of infective juveniles is eventually released into the environment to infect other hosts and continue their lifecycle.

== Morphology ==
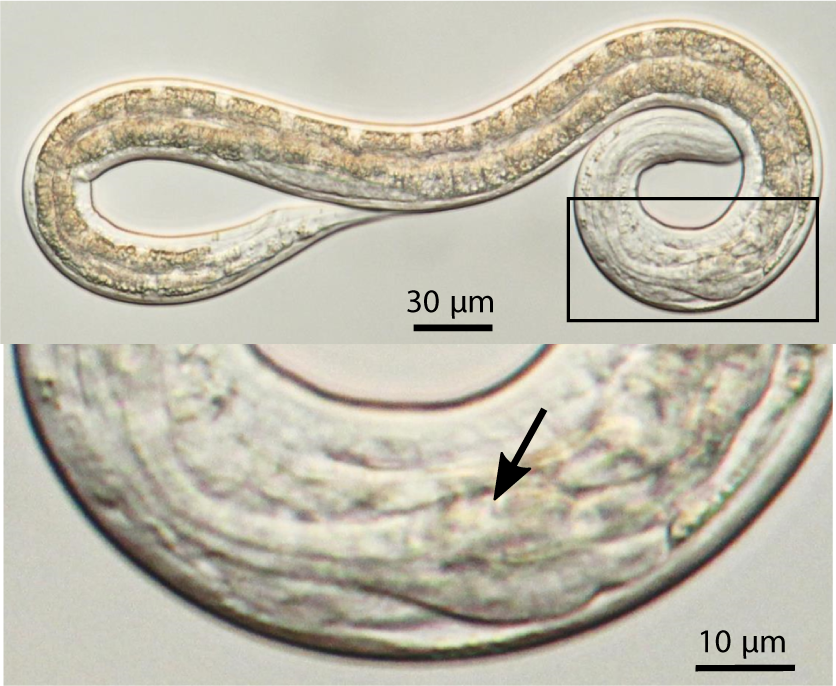
Morphological changes during the activation of a Steinernema carpocapsae infective juvenile. The IJ was imaged at 400× magnification and the black box is magnified in the image below. The arrow is pointing to the basal bulb of the pharynx, which expands during activation.

The IJ stage is the only free-living and therefore environmentally tolerant stage, thus S. carpocapsae nematodes are formulated and applied as infective juveniles. S. carpocapsae IJs are between 0.44–0.65 mm in length, with males ranging from 1–1.7 mm and females ranging from 2.8–5.1 mm in length. The IJs can be stored in tap water or buffer for several months, and can even be frozen for long term storage in liquid nitrogen. When stored, the nematodes tend to display reduced movement, though disturbed nematodes move actively. S. carpocapsae and other ambush foragers, when stored in water soon revert to a characteristic J-shaped resting position, meaning that they have a straight body posture with a minor kink at the end of the tail. In short, lack of movement is not always a sign of mortality; nematodes may have to be stimulated (e.g., probes, acetic acid, gentle heat) to move before assessing viability. Living infective juveniles, that would still be useful in biological control, tend to possess high lipid levels that provide a dense appearance, whereas nearly transparent nematodes are often active but possess limited infection capabilities.

Insects killed by most steinernematid nematodes, including S. carpocapsae, become brown or tan, distinctly different from insects killed by heterorhabditids, which become red and the tissues assume a gummy consistency. Black cadavers with associated putrefaction indicate that the host was not killed by entomopathogenic species. Nematodes found within such cadavers tend to be free-living soil saprophages.

The developmentally arrested IJ stage will activate upon exposure to insect tissue. The process of activation includes morphological changes, resumption of development, release of symbiotic bacteria, and release of a variety of proteins thought to be involved in active parasitism. The morphological changes associated with activation include opening of the mouth and anus, opening of the oesophagus, expansion of the basal bulb of the pharynx, and the initiation of pumping of the pharynx.

== Mechanism ==
The immunomodulatory and pathogenic properties of parasitic nematodes are largely attributed to the excretory/secretory (ES) products they release during infection. The infective larvae also start spewing out a complex cocktail of proteins. When researchers isolated and examined this mixture more closely, they found that it was made up of 472 different proteins – many of them are proteases. For the average insect, a lethal dose of Xenorhabdus nematophilus consists of about 3500 bacterial cells. But, each S. carpocapsae only carries 20—200 cells of X. nematophilus – well below the lethal dose. The fact that a single worm is enough to kill an insect host with so few bacterial cells means that S. carpocapsae is not just relying on the bacteria to do all the work.

== Habitat ==
Steinernematid nematodes are exclusively soil organisms. They are ubiquitous, having been isolated from every inhabited continent from a wide range of ecologically diverse soil habitats including cultivated fields, forests, grasslands, deserts, and even ocean beaches. When surveyed, entomopathogenic nematodes are recovered from 2% to 45% of sites sample.

== Distribution ==
Asia, Africa, North, Central, South America and Caribbean, Oceania, and Europe.
