= Xenorhabdus eapokensis =

Scientific classification
- Domain: Bacteria
- Kingdom: Pseudomonadati
- Phylum: Pseudomonadota
- Class: Gammaproteobacteria
- Order: Enterobacterales
- Family: Morganellaceae
- Genus: Xenorhabdus
- Species: X. eapokensis

Binomial name
- Xenorhabdus eapokensis Kämpfer et al. 2017

Type strain
- CCM 8728, LMG 29917, DL20

Species of bacterium

Xenorhabdus eapokensis is a Gram-negative and rod-shaped bacterium from the genus of Xenorhabdus which has been isolated from the nematodes Steinernema sangi and Steinernema eapokense from soil from Vietnam.
