= Xenorhabdus magdalenensis =

Scientific classification
- Domain: Bacteria
- Kingdom: Pseudomonadati
- Phylum: Pseudomonadota
- Class: Gammaproteobacteria
- Order: Enterobacterales
- Family: Morganellaceae
- Genus: Xenorhabdus
- Species: X. magdalenensis

Binomial name
- Xenorhabdus magdalenensis Tailliez et al. 2012

Type strain
- DSM 24915, IMI 397775

Species of bacterium

Xenorhabdus magdalenensis is a bacterium from the genus of Xenorhabdus which has been isolated from the nematode Steinernema australe which has been isolated from the Isla Magdalena National Park on Chile.
