= Xenorhabdus szentirmaii =

Scientific classification
- Domain: Bacteria
- Kingdom: Pseudomonadati
- Phylum: Pseudomonadota
- Class: Gammaproteobacteria
- Order: Enterobacterales
- Family: Morganellaceae
- Genus: Xenorhabdus
- Species: X. szentirmaii

Binomial name
- Xenorhabdus szentirmaii Lengyel et al. 2005

Type strain
- CIP 108895, DSM 16338, NCIMB 14019

Species of bacterium

Xenorhabdus szentirmaii is a bacterium from the genus Xenorhabdus which has been isolated from the nematode Steinernema rarum in Argentina. Xenorhabdus szentirmaii produces szentiamide, xenematide, bicornutin A xenofuranone A and xenofuranone B.
