= Xenorhabdus khoisanae =

Scientific classification
- Domain: Bacteria
- Kingdom: Pseudomonadati
- Phylum: Pseudomonadota
- Class: Gammaproteobacteria
- Order: Enterobacterales
- Family: Morganellaceae
- Genus: Xenorhabdus
- Species: X. khoisanae

Binomial name
- Xenorhabdus khoisanae Ferreira et al. 2013

Type strain
- ATCC BAA-2406, DSM 25463, SF87

Species of bacterium

Xenorhabdus khoisanae is a bacterium from the genus Xenorhabdus which has been isolated from the nematode Steinernema khoisanae in the Western Cape Province in South Africa.
