= Xenorhabdus budapestensis =

Scientific classification
- Domain: Bacteria
- Kingdom: Pseudomonadati
- Phylum: Pseudomonadota
- Class: Gammaproteobacteria
- Order: Enterobacterales
- Family: Morganellaceae
- Genus: Xenorhabdus
- Species: X. budapestensis

Binomial name
- Xenorhabdus budapestensis Lengyel et al. 2005

Type strain
- CIP 108891, DSM 16342, NCIMB 14016

Species of bacterium

Xenorhabdus budapestensis is a bacterium from the genus of Xenorhabdus which has been isolated from the nematode Steinernema bicornutum in Subotica in Serbia. Xenorhabdus budapestensis produces bicornutin A2.
