= Xenorhabdus kozodoii =

Scientific classification
- Domain: Bacteria
- Kingdom: Pseudomonadati
- Phylum: Pseudomonadota
- Class: Gammaproteobacteria
- Order: Enterobacterales
- Family: Morganellaceae
- Genus: Xenorhabdus
- Species: X. kozodoii

Binomial name
- Xenorhabdus kozodoii Tailliez et al. 2006

Type strain
- CIP 109068, DSM 17907, SaV

Species of bacterium

Xenorhabdus kozodoii is a bacterium from the genus Xenorhabdus which has been isolated from the nematode Steinernema arenarium in Voronez in Russia and from the nematode Steinernema apuliae in Italy.
