= Xenorhabdus doucetiae =

Scientific classification
- Domain: Bacteria
- Kingdom: Pseudomonadati
- Phylum: Pseudomonadota
- Class: Gammaproteobacteria
- Order: Enterobacterales
- Family: Morganellaceae
- Genus: Xenorhabdus
- Species: X. doucetiae

Binomial name
- Xenorhabdus doucetiae Tailliez et al. 2006

Type strain
- CIP 109074, DSM 17909, FRM16

Species of bacterium

Xenorhabdus doucetiae is a bacterium from the genus of Xenorhabdus which has been isolated from the nematode Steinernema diaprepesi from Martinique in France.
