= Steinernema riobrave =

Scientific classification
- Domain: Eukaryota
- Kingdom: Animalia
- Phylum: Nematoda
- Class: Chromadorea
- Order: Rhabditida
- Family: Steinernematidae
- Genus: Steinernema
- Species: S. riobrave

Binomial name
- Steinernema riobrave Cabanillas, Poinar & Raulston, 1994

Species of nematode

Steinernema riobrave is a species of nematodes belonging to the family Steinernematidae.

The species is found in United States. They are an entomopathogenic nematode of termites.
