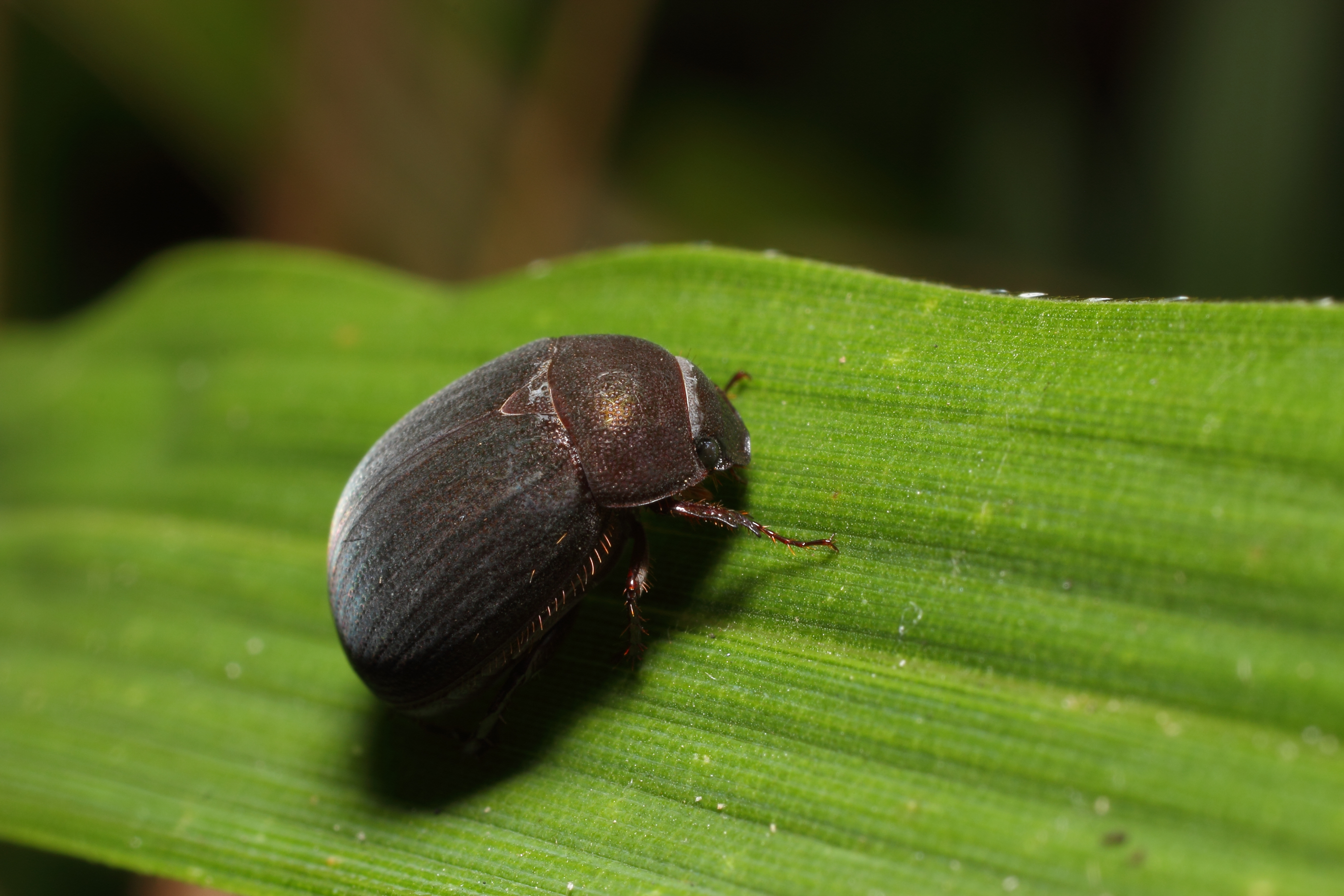
- Maladera japonica

Scientific classification
- Kingdom: Animalia
- Phylum: Arthropoda
- Clade: Pancrustacea
- Class: Insecta
- Order: Coleoptera
- Suborder: Polyphaga
- Infraorder: Scarabaeiformia
- Family: Scarabaeidae
- Subfamily: Sericinae
- Tribe: Sericini
- Genus: Maladera; Mulsant & Rey, 1871

Diversity
- at least 480 species

Synonyms
- Aserica Lewis, 1895

= Maladera =

Genus of beetles

Maladera is a genus in the beetle family Scarabaeidae, containing species such as Maladera insanabilis and Maladera castanea. There are at least 480 described species in Maladera.

== Subgenera ==
The genus is divided in the following subgenera:

- Maladera
- Amaladera Reitter, 1896
- Aserica Lewis, 1895
- Cephaloserica Brenske, 1900
- Cycloserica Reitter, 1896
- Eumaladera Nomura, 1967
- Eusericula Reitter, 1902
- Hemiserica Brenske, 1894
- Macroserica Medvedev, 1952
- Omaladera Reitter, 1896

== See also ==
- List of Maladera species

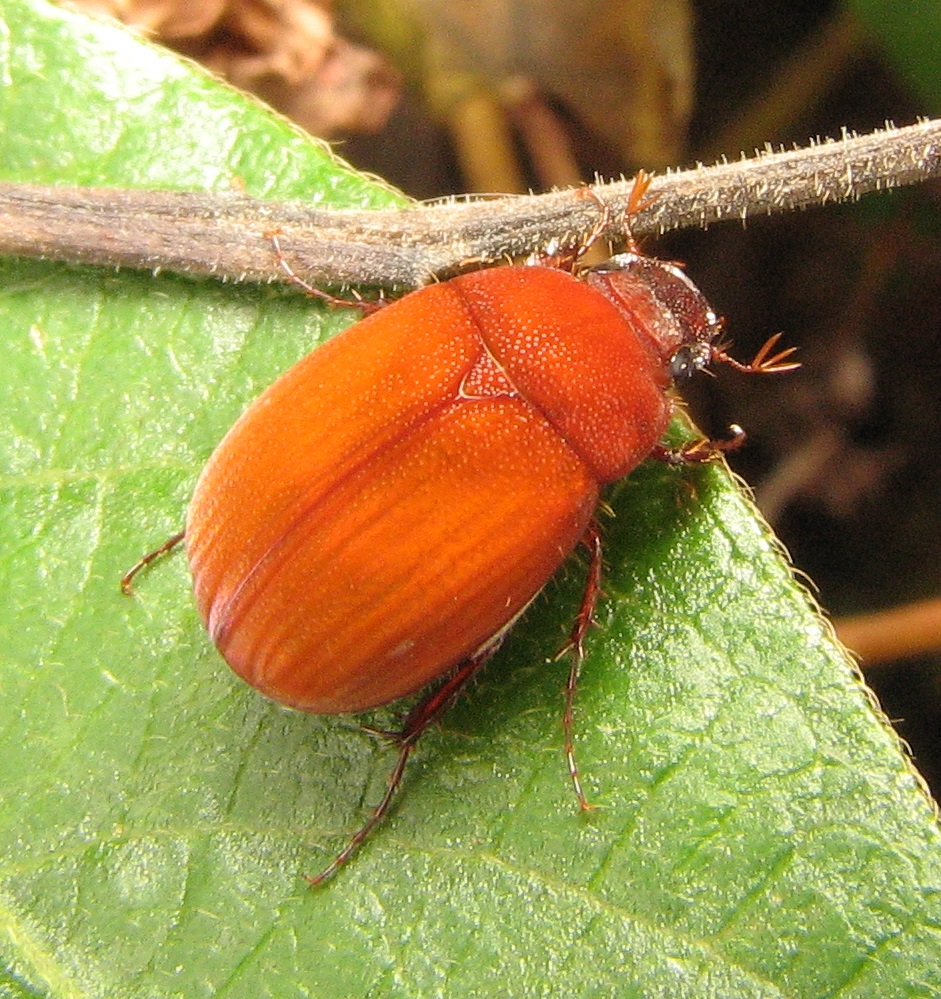
Maladera castanea
