= Xenorhabdus =

Scientific classification
- Domain: Bacteria
- Kingdom: Pseudomonadati
- Phylum: Pseudomonadota
- Class: Gammaproteobacteria
- Order: Enterobacterales
- Family: Morganellaceae
- Genus: Xenorhabdus; Thomas & Poinar, 1979

Species
- Xenorhabdus beddingii Xenorhabdus bovienii Xenorhabdus budapestensis Xenorhabdus cabanillasii Xenorhabdus doucetiae Xenorhabdus eapokensis Xenorhabdus ehlersii Xenorhabdus griffiniae Xenorhabdus hominickii Xenorhabdus indica Xenorhabdus innexi Xenorhabdus ishibashii Xenorhabdus japonica Xenorhabdus khoisanae Xenorhabdus koppenhoeferi Xenorhabdus kozodoii Xenorhabdus magdalenensis Xenorhabdus mauleonii Xenorhabdus miraniensis Xenorhabdus nematophila Xenorhabdus poinarii Xenorhabdus romanii Xenorhabdus stockiae Xenorhabdus szentirmaii Xenorhabdus thuongxuanensis Xenorhabdus vietnamensis

Genus of bacteria

Xenorhabdus is a genus of motile, gram-negative bacteria from the family of the Morganellaceae. All the species of the genus are only known to live in symbiosis with soil entomopathogenic nematodes from the genus Steinernema.

Although no free-living forms of Xenorhabdus have ever been isolated outside of the nematode host, the benefits for the bacteria are still unknown. However, it has been demonstrated that the nematode can't establish within its insect host without the bacteria.

The tripartite Xenorhabdus-nematode-insect interaction represents a model system in which both mutualistic and pathogenic processes can be studied in a single bacterial species. In the laboratory, some species are virulent even when artificially injected into the insect host, whereas others species need the nematode to affect the insect.

== Lifecycle ==
1. In the non-infestant-stage nematode living in the soil, Xenorhabdus spp. are carried in a specialized region of the intestine, termed the receptacle.
2. At the third-stage of development, the infective juvenile (IJs) invade the hemocoel of susceptible insect hosts.
3. The bacteria are released in the insect hemocoel, where they overcome the insect's defense systems and produce numerous virulence factors such as hemolysin and cytotoxin. They participate in suppressing insect immunity and killing the host.
4. The bacteria proliferate to high levels in the insect cadaver and produce diverse antimicrobial compounds that suppress the growth of antagonistic microorganisms. Xenorhabdus spp. also secrete an array of exoenzymes that stimulate macromolecular degradation, the products of which, together with the bacteria themselves, are thought to provide a nutrient base for nematode growth and reproduction.
5. When nematode numbers become high and nutrients become limiting in the insect cadaver, nematode progeny re-associate with bacteria and differentiate into colonized, non-feeding IJs that emerge into the soil to forage for new hosts.

Xenorhabdus, like Photorhabdus bacteria, has a striking feature of phase variation. Phase I variants are involved in the symbiotic relationship with entomopathogenic nematodes and are isolated from the nonfeeding infective stage nematodes and the body cavities of insects killed by these nematodes. No role in symbiosis has yet been determined for phase II, which is associated only with entomopathogenic nematodes under laboratory conditions.

== Biological pest control ==
The mutualistic association between Xenorhabdus and Steinernema represents an insecticidal complex, active against a large range of insect pests. Indeed, the complex is used in biological pest control, and is very efficient against insects such as Spodoptera exigua (Lepidoptera), Cydia pomonella (Lepidoptera), Leptinotarsa decemlineata (Coleoptera), family Tipulidae (Diptera). These bacteria inhabit the gut of the Asian corn borer, a moth pest of maize in East Asia, and kills it within 48 hours.

Xenorhabdus nematophila is the most widely used species in biological control, in association with Steinernema carpocapsae and S. feltiae.

The pathogenicity of the complex is "species-specific", which means that the complex can only be active against a specific range of insects.

The Steinernema-Xenorhabdus association is currently sold as a biocontrol agent by private companies, like Biobest, SUMI AGRO, e-nema and Biosafe.

== Perspectives ==
A study carried out by Furgani G. & Al suggests that the antibiotic compounds produced by Xenorhabdus to preserve the insect cadaver from others bacteria may be used in the aim of controlling mastitis caused by bacteria. Indeed, X. budapestensis, X. szentirmaii and X. nematophila appear to be efficient against pathogens such as Staphylococcus aureus and Escherichia coli.

== Bibliography ==
- Goodrich-Blair H. & Clarke D.J. (2007). Mutualism and pathogenesis in Xenorhabdus and Photorhabdus: two roads for the same destination. Molecular Microbiology (2007) 64(2), 260–268. doi: 10.1111/j.1365-2958.2007.05671.x
- Sicard M. & Al (2004). When mutualists are pathogens: an experimental study of the symbioses between Steinernema (entomopathogenic nematodes) and Xenorhabdus (bacteria). Genome Biology And Evolution 17(2004)985-993. doi: 10.1111/j.1420-9101.2004.00748.x
- Pilar F. & Al (2006). Phylogenetic relationships of Bacteria with special reference to endosymbionts and enteric species. The Prokaryotes, pp 41–59.
