= Steinernema hermaphroditum =

Scientific classification
- Domain: Eukaryota
- Kingdom: Animalia
- Phylum: Nematoda
- Class: Chromadorea
- Order: Rhabditida
- Family: Steinernematidae
- Genus: Steinernema
- Species: S. hermaphroditum

Binomial name
- Steinernema hermaphroditum Stock, Griffin & Chaerai, 2004

Species of nematodes

Steinernema hermaphroditum is a species of nematodes in the Steinernematidae family.

It was the first steinernematid reported to be able to self fertilize. The species has been classified as androdioecious.
