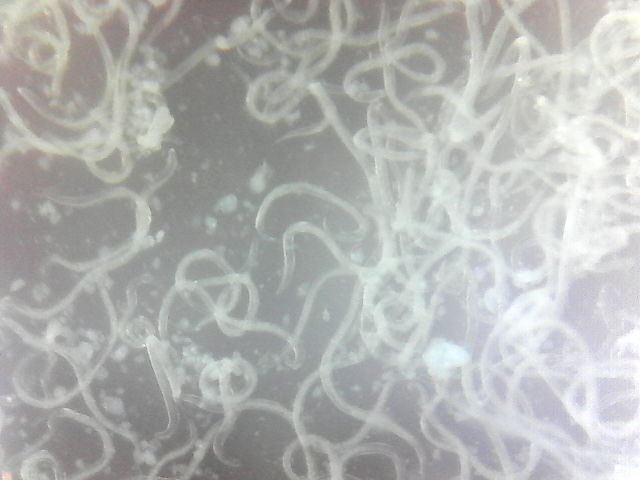

Scientific classification
- Kingdom: Animalia
- Phylum: Nematoda
- Class: Chromadorea
- Order: Rhabditida
- Family: Steinernematidae
- Genus: Steinernema
- Species: S. feltiae

Binomial name
- Steinernema feltiae Filipjev, 1934

= Steinernema feltiae =

Species of nematode

Steinernema feltiae is a species of nematode in the family Steinernematidae. It is an entomopathogenic roundworm that infects insects.

== Agricultural use ==
S. feltiae has been used in agriculture as a biological control agent against insect pests. It is effective between 8 °C and 25 °C and has been shown to infect various moths, flies, and beetles. S. feltiae infects insects in the immature stage and releases symbiotic bacteria, such as Xenorhabdus species, that produce toxins which kill the host insect.
