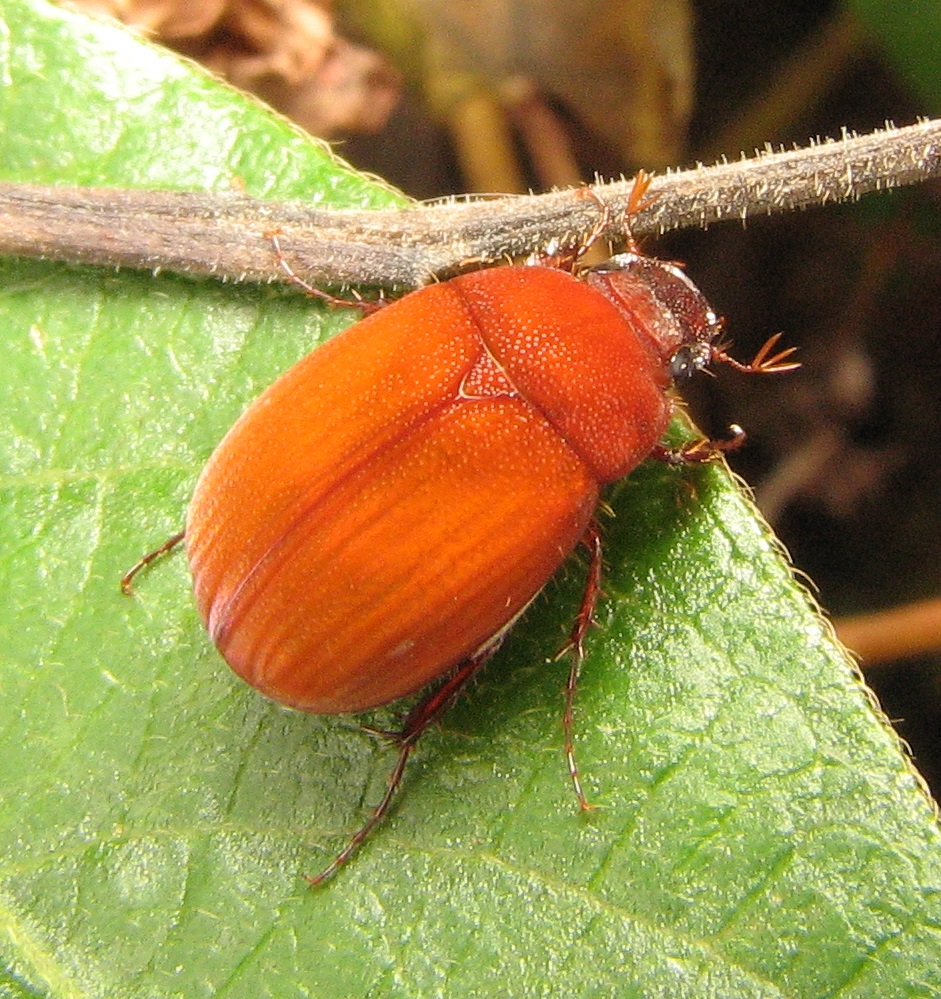

Scientific classification
- Kingdom: Animalia
- Phylum: Arthropoda
- Clade: Pancrustacea
- Class: Insecta
- Order: Coleoptera
- Suborder: Polyphaga
- Infraorder: Scarabaeiformia
- Family: Scarabaeidae
- Genus: Maladera
- Species: M. formosae

Binomial name
- Maladera formosae (Brenske, 1898)

Synonyms
- Autoserica formosae Brenske, 1899; Serica (Autoserica) korgei Petrovitz, 1967; Autoserica castanea Arrow, 1913

= Maladera formosae =

Species of beetle

Maladera formosae, commonly known as the Asiatic garden beetle and formerly known as Maladera castanea, is a species of beetle in the family Scarabaeidae. It is native to Japan, China, Taiwan, South Korea, North Korea, and Russia but was introduced to North America in the 1920s where it is considered a pest of turfs, gardens, and crop fields. Adults are active in the summer during which they can be found feeding on leaves and flowers or gathering around light sources at night.

== Morphology ==
Adults range in length from 8-9mm and are reddish-brown in color with an iridescent sheen. Larvae, similarly to larvae of other species in the family Scarabaeidae, are referred to as white grubs. M. formosae grubs grow from approximately 1.4 mm to 19 mm in length as they feed on plant roots and decaying plant material.

Maladera formosae are frequently mistaken for other species of scarab beetles. However, adults can be distinguished by their sturdy bodies, reddish-brown hue with an iridescent shine, concealed labrum, antenna with 10 segments, flat rear tibia featuring apical spurs separated by tarsal articulations, and elongated male genitalia with sizable, movable apical hooks.

Larvae have C-shaped bodies, are predominantly white, and have brownish-orange white heads. M. formosae larvae can be distinguished from other white grub larvae by their prominent maxillary stipes, aggressive behavior, and unique chevron-shaped raster pattern underneath their Y-shaped anal slits.

== Geographic distribution ==
Maladera formosae is native to East Asia. Aside from the type locality Taiwan (formerly known as Formosa), it was also native to China, Japan, North Korea, South Korea, and eastern Russia. It has also become established in the United States as an invasive species. M. formosae was first discovered in North America in the United States, specifically in New Jersey in 1921. In its first decade in the United States, M. formosae spread throughout the East Coast. By 1933, M. formosae was recorded within 10 states and 1 district consisting of Connecticut, Delaware, Maryland, Massachusetts, New Jersey, New York, Pennsylvania, Rhode Island, South Carolina, Virginia, and Washington, D.C. It then spread southward and westward, leading to it being found by 2009 in at least 11 additional states, including Alabama, Georgia, Illinois, Indiana, Maine, Michigan, New Hampshire, North Carolina, Ohio, Vermont, and West Virginia with possible identification in Kansas and Missouri. The most recent state in which M. formosae was newly reported is Florida in 2012. M. formosae has also been identified in the two Canadian provinces of Quebec in 1996 and Nova Scotia in 2003. In total, M. formosae is now found in the United States in at least 24 states and Canada in 2 provinces.

== Diet ==
Adult beetles feed most actively during the night. Their diet consists predominantly of the foliage and flowers of various plants totaling over 100 different species. They also feed sparingly on blades of grass. Foliage consumption typically progresses inwards and, when beetles are abundant, only the midvein of the leaf will remains. This damage is often not attributed to M. formosae—their nighttime feeding means they are rarely observed in the act.

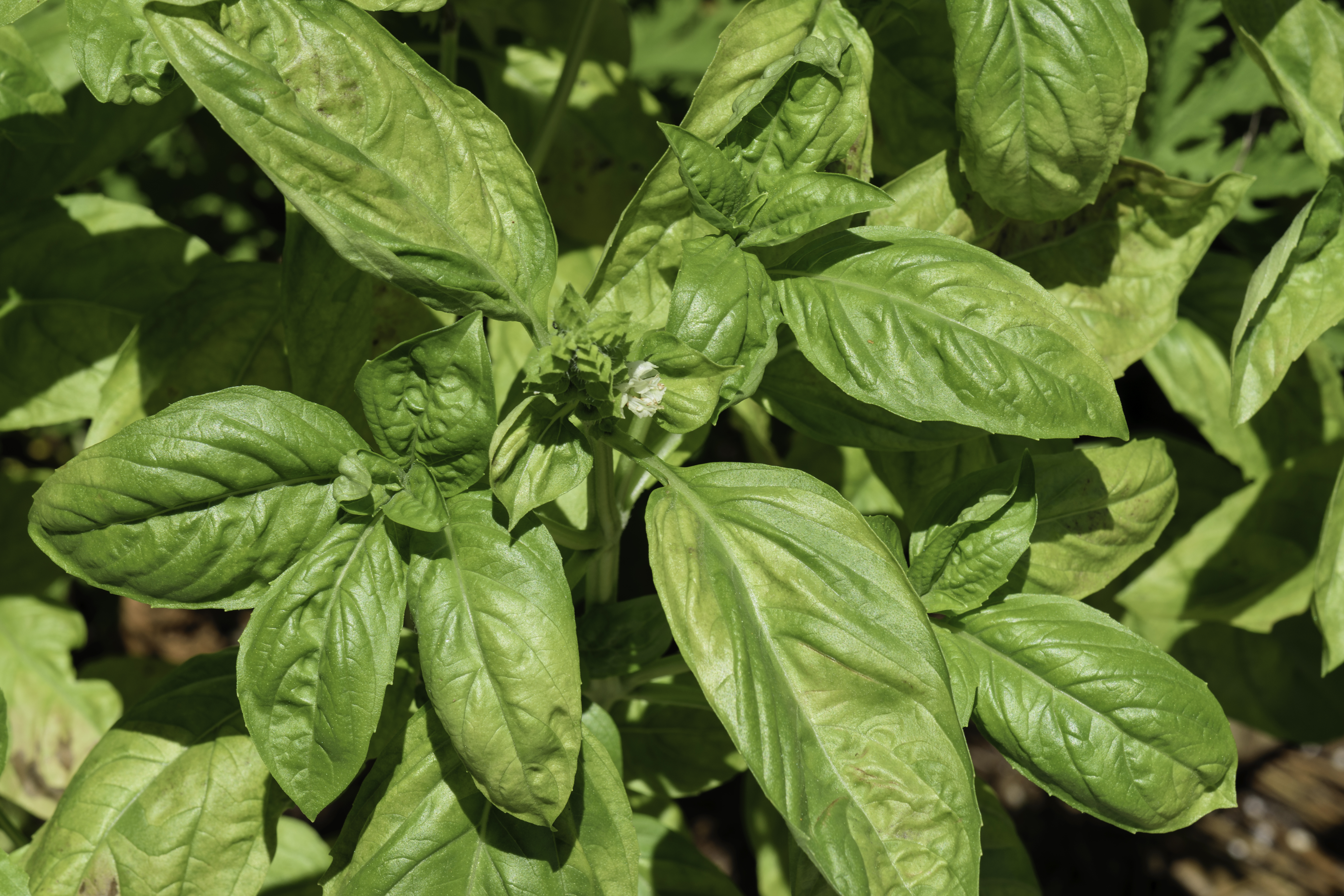
Basil (preferred host plant for Maladera formosae)

Adults prefer eating flowers like asters, chrysanthemums, dahlias, goldenrods, roses, strawflowers, sunflowers, and zinnias. Grubs act as pests for various ornamentals, turfs, and gardens along with field crops, such as sweet potatoes, soybeans, and corn. They typically feed on plant roots and decaying plant material. Field and laboratory experiments have been performed assessing adult beetle preference for different host plants. Field experiments found that basil was preferred compared to beet, carrot, eggplant, hot pepper, kohlrabi, parsnip, sweet pepper, and turnip. Laboratory experiments found that basil was preferred when compared to American sweetgum, arrowwood viburnum, elderberry, green ash, red maple, and sugar maple, but equally preferred when compared to beets and kohlrabi.

== Life cycle ==
Maladera formosae undergoes a similar life cycle to other white grub pests like Japanese beetles and masked chafers. It undergoes a complete metamorphosis with one generation each year, though the exact timing of its life stages depends on temperature and humidity. Research has, however, suggested that multiple generations can be produced each year, granted a sufficiently warm and moist environment is provided.

=== Eggs ===
After mating in July or August, females lay groups of eggs 1-10cm below the surface. They typically lay 3-15 groups of up to 20 eggs each with total egg counts averaging approximately 60 eggs, though as many as 178 eggs have been observed for a single female beetle. Females prefer ovipositing in moist, sandy soils that are near host plants or beneath shady plants. These preferred environments are usually well-irrigated, weedy patches of turf. Eggs absorb and swell from moisture in soil over time, which is consistent with other white grub species. Eggs hatch within 10 days with most larvae emerging in mid July.

=== Larvae ===
Larvae undergo three instars, growing from 1.4mm to 19mm. First-instar larvae feed on young roots and decaying plant material in shallower soil up to 13cm deep. Larvae molt to enter their second and third instars once they have eaten enough. They typically enter their third instar by September or mid October. Larvae then overwinter by burrowing and becoming dormant beneath the frost line, 15-30cm below the surface. Approximately one-quarter of larvae are slow to mature or late to hatch. Such larvae often do not reach their third instar before the arrival of winter. Some of these larvae can survive the winter in their second instars, but first-instar larvae typically fail to do so. In the following spring, surviving larvae will burrow closer to the surface and continue feeding 13cm deep or less in the soil.

=== Pupae ===
After approximately 10 months, third-instar larvae pupate in June or July by compacting soil 4-10cm underneath the surface. They enter their prepupal stage first, becoming inactive for 4 days before fully pupating. After 10 days, they emerge as adults in July but remain in their pupal skin for several more days as their exoskeletons harden.

=== Adults ===
Adults usually live no more than a month but can live for up to 100 days. They are usually seen from the period ranging from late June to the end of October during which they feed, mate, and reproduce.

== Parental care ==
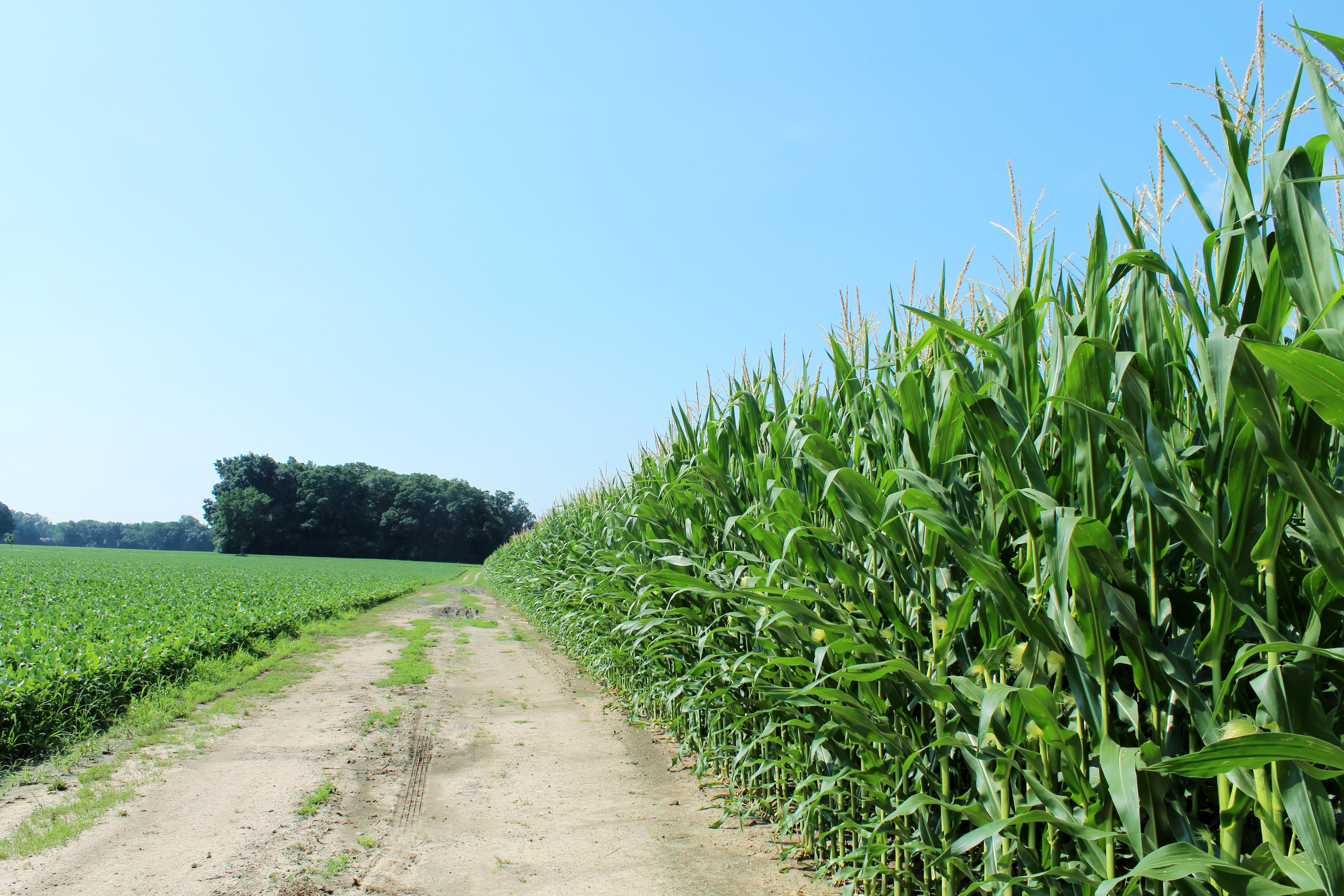
Soybean and corn fields

Females prefer specific host plants, soil moistures, and types of soil for ovipositioning. Specifically, moist, cool soil that is shaded by canopies is preferred. M. formosae is mainly found in regions with long grass, but it shows no preference for ovipositioning in short or long grass environments. However, females have demonstrated a preference for corn-soybean fields for oviposition. Moist environments can prevent the female's eggs from drying out. As a mechanism for pest control, modifying these variables can reduce oviposition to regulate the number of this species. Furthermore, studying the pheromones that this species possesses can be useful for controlling mating and oviposition rates to monitor species numbers.

== Sex determination ==
In theory, the sex of individual beetles can be identified by females having more pronounced front tibia. However, this is difficult to identify in individual beetles given that they vary in size and no database for leg size measurements exists. Instead, sex determination for M. formosae can be quickly performed under a dissecting microscope or hand lens by assessing posterior abdominal sternite and pygidium orientation. The pygidiums of males pinch the edges of their sternites, while the pygidiums of females do not do so.

== Ecosystem interactions ==
Maladera formosae is typically considered a minor pest of turf and ornamentals. However, these beetles quickly become a major nuisance when they grow to be locally abundant: larval radicular feeding and adult foliar feeding cause major damage.

=== Midwestern crop fields ===
Maladera formosae has become a problem for crop fields found throughout Ohio, Michigan, and Indiana, for which it has been reported as being even more damaging than other white grub species. Many crop fields in these states undergo a crop rotation between mint, corn, and soybeans. It is believed by researchers that M. formosae populations persist throughout the entirety of these crop rotations, feeding on the crops themselves and causing significant damage. Researchers have estimated that M. formosae larvae cause a loss of $325 per acre of land for growers in these states.

=== Strawberry fields ===
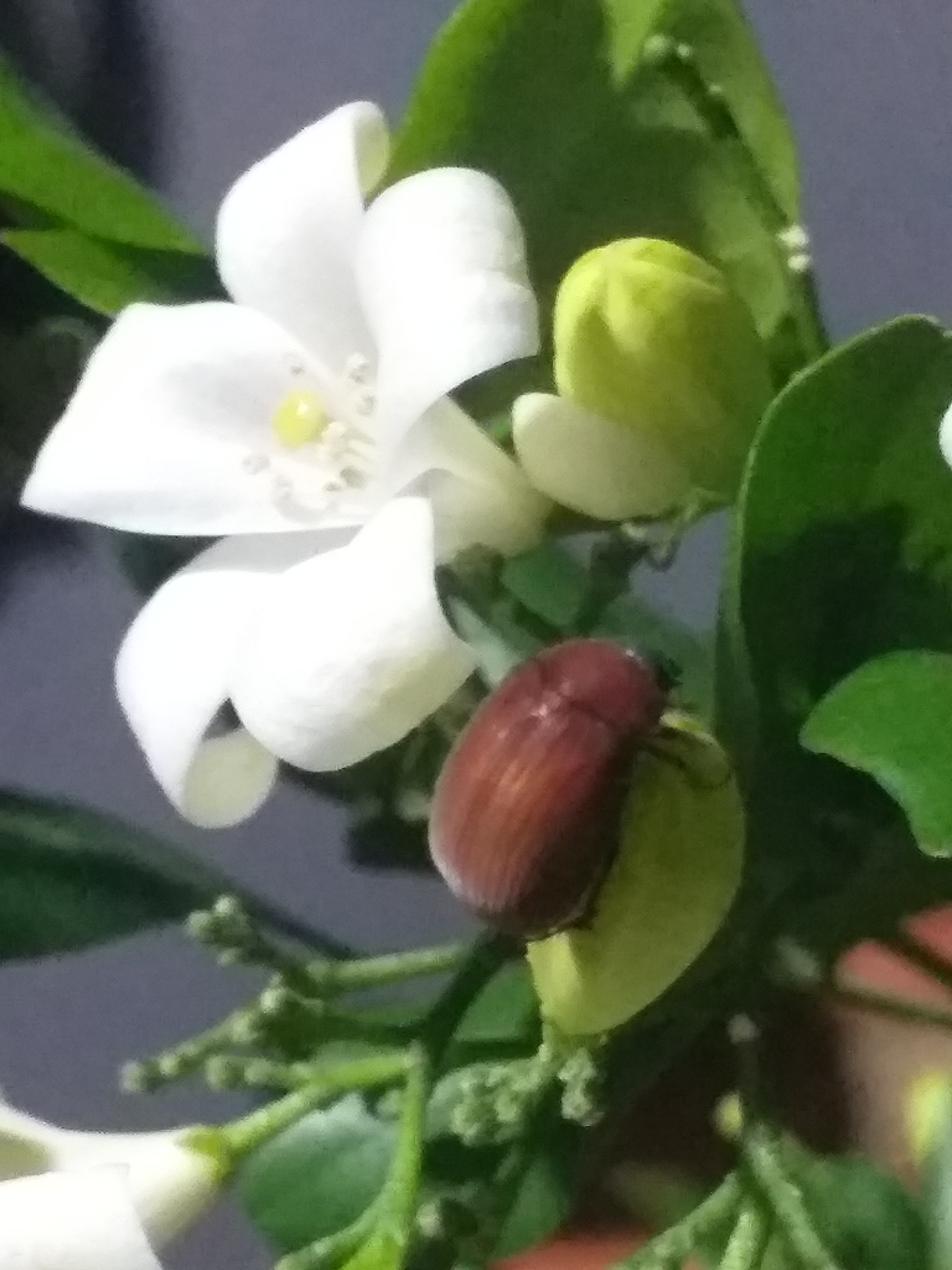
Maladera formosae on what appears to be a jasmine plant

Various root diseases and root-feeding insects have been found to harm perennial strawberry cultivation within the northeastern United States. The most important of these damaging factors are black root rot disease caused by Rhizoctonia fragariae and physical root damage caused by white grubs and root weevils. Alongside Anomala orientalis, M. formosae has been identified as being amongst the most common white grub pests of Connecticut strawberry fields. Research studies have shown that physical damage by M. formosae did not affect rates of root infection.

=== Insecticide control ===
Current pest control options for M. formosae are limited, relying primarily on insecticides that are either ineffective or unevaluated for M. formosae. The Food Quality Protection Act of 1996 has also enacted restrictions that ban many carbamate and organophosphate insecticides traditionally used for white grub control. Of such options, only carbaryl, a carbamate, and trichlorfon, an organophosphate, remain viable for use on turfgrass.

Imidacloprid, a neonicotinoid, and halofenozide, a molt-accelerating compound, have been proven to be effective in controlling white grub populations. They are, however, limited in only being able to target eggs and larvae, which are difficult to detect due to being subterranean. Researchers believe this conflict in effectiveness of insecticides leads to overtreatment and mistreatment of agricultural fields with minimal or nonexistent M. formosae presence. This has the potential to create negative implications, such as expensive financial losses, increased resistance development, and unintended environmental consequences.

Though grubs typically cause the most damage by feeding on plant roots, M. formosae adults are still an agricultural concern as they can defoliate several rows of field crops every night and their dispersal determines the location of future larval populations. Grub populations are difficult to notice but respond to limited insecticides. Adult populations are easier to notice than grub populations but respond to even fewer pesticide options, presenting a separate though related problem when compared to that of grubs.

=== Nematode control ===
Entomopathogenic nematodes have been identified by researchers as an effective biological control for other white grub species. However, their efficacy for M. formosae is still being studied as the beetle has been shown to be less susceptible to common nematode strains, such as Heterohabditis bacteriophora and Steinernema glaseri, when compared to other white grub species. Another isolated strain, Steinernema scarabaei, has been identified in research studies as a possible alternative to pesticides for M. formosae given its high pathogenicity for M. formosae.

=== Sampling methods ===
Due to grubs being subterranean and adults being nocturnal, M. formosae infestation can be difficult to recognize. Researchers have compared the effectiveness of various sampling techniques, such as using compact cutters, golf hole cup cutters, and wire-mesh bait stations to improve methods for quantification of M. formosae grub population density. They found that the golf hole cup cutters presented the best option, as it is more sensitive than the other methods.
