= Armyworm =

Armyworms are the caterpillars of some members of two genera:

- Many Spodoptera including:
  - African armyworm (Spodoptera exempta) (Africa)
  - Fall armyworm (Spodoptera frugiperda) (North and South America)
  - Lawn armyworm (Spodoptera mauritia)
- Some Mythimna (moth) including:
  - Common armyworm or true armyworm (Mythimna unipuncta) (North and South America)
  - Northern armyworm, Oriental armyworm or rice ear-cutting caterpillar (Mythimna separata) (Asia)
