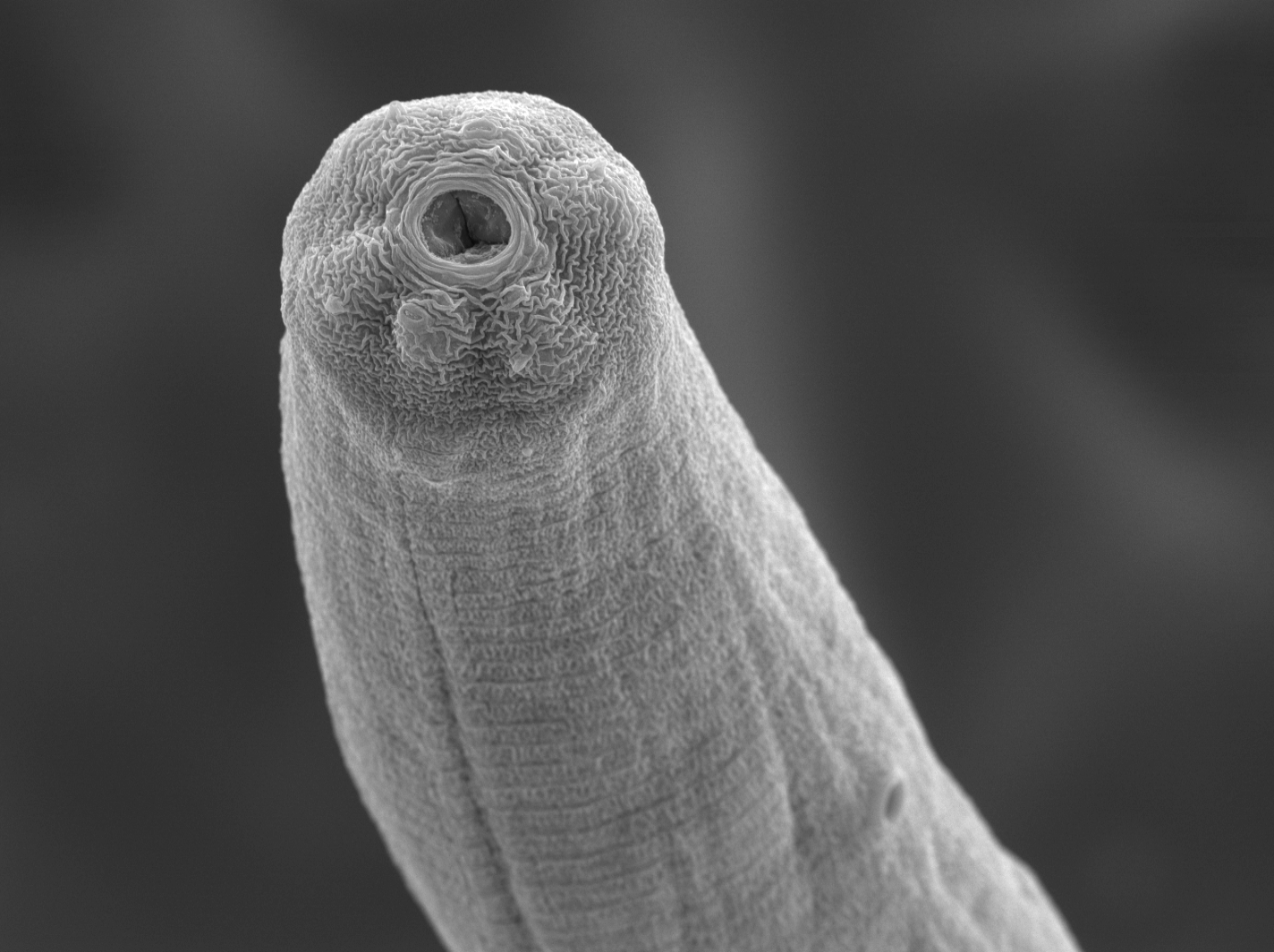
- Steinernema carpocapsae

Scientific classification
- Kingdom: Animalia
- Phylum: Nematoda
- Class: Chromadorea
- Order: Rhabditida
- Family: Steinernematidae
- Genus: Steinernema; Travassos

Species
- See text

Synonyms
- Neoaplectana Steiner, 1929; Patanodontus de Villalobos & Camino, 1997; Steineria Travassos, 1927

= Steinernema =

Genus of roundworms

Steinernema is a genus of nematodes in the family of Steinernematidae. The genus Steinernema is named after the nematologist Gotthold Steiner. Nematodes of this genus have been shown to be effective as a biological control for agricultural pests of the Scarabaeidae family, such as Maladera formosae.

== Life cycle ==
Species form symbiotic relationships with Xenorhabdus and Photorhabdus bacteria. The free-living third stage juvenile, termed a dauer juvenile, enters its insect hosts through natural openings, such as the mouth, anus, and spiracles.

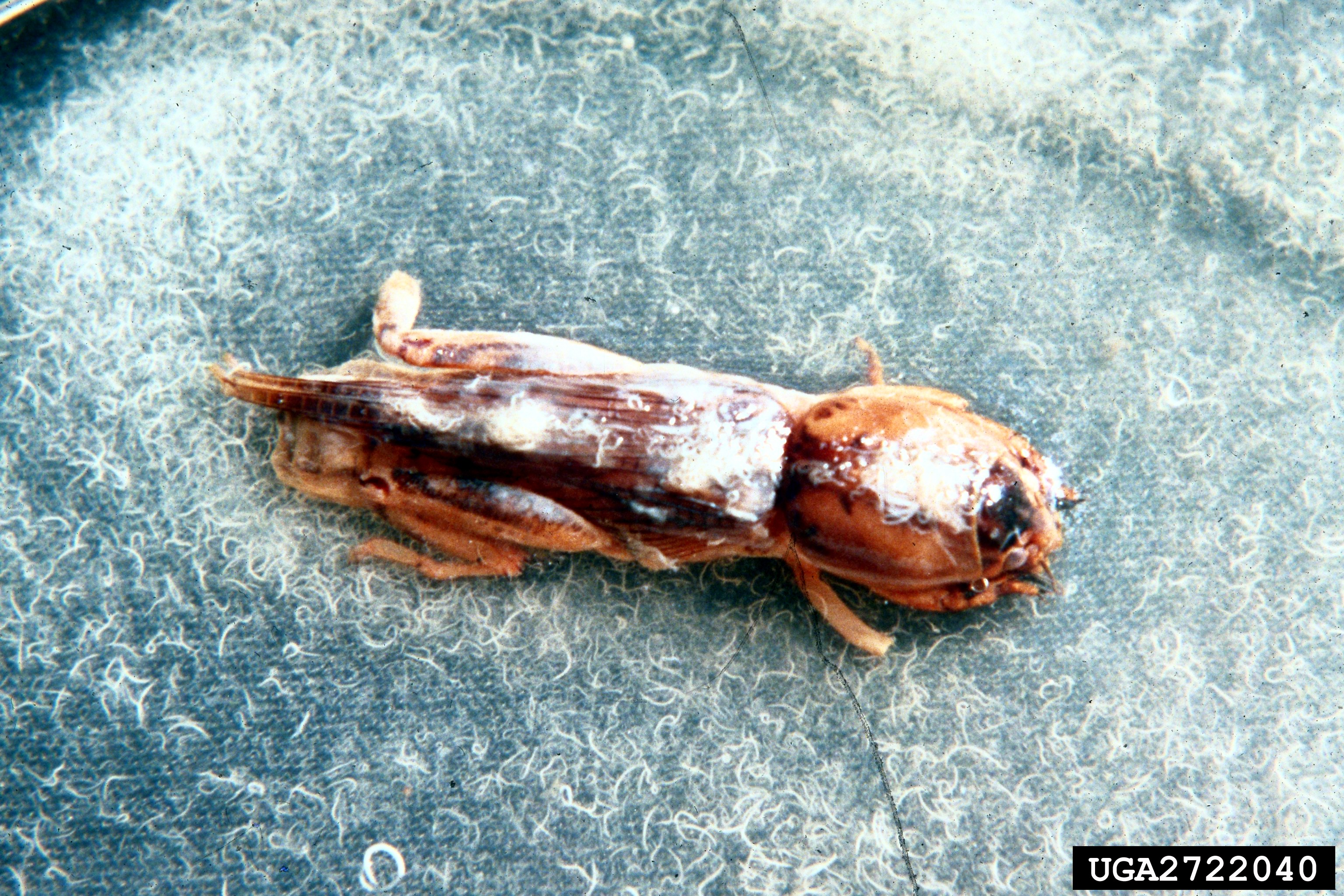
Steinernema scapterisci emerging from Neoscapteriscus vicinus

Bacterial cells from the intestines are regurgitated into the insect. The insect hemolymph provides a rich medium for the bacterial cells which grow, releasing toxins and exoenzymes, causing the insect host to die from septicemia. The bacteria also produce other compounds to protect the insect from other microbes in the soil.

The nematode moves out of its developmentally arrested third, nonfeeding stage, triggered by either bacterial or insect food signals. The nematodes feed on the bacteria and moult to the fourth stage, reaching adulthood within a few days. with separate male and female individuals. Nematode development continues for two to three generations. When insufficient nutrient remain adult development is suppressed. Developmentally arrested third stage juveniles accumulate and emerge into the soil, where they may survive for months until a new suitable host is found.

== Species ==
The following species have been described:

- Steinernema abbasi
- Steinernema aciari
- Steinernema adamsi
- Steinernema affine
- Steinernema akhursti
- Steinernema anatoliense
- Steinernema anomali
- Steinernema apuliae
- Steinernema arenarium
- Steinernema ashiuense
- Steinernema australe
- Steinernema backanense
- Steinernema beddingi
- Steinernema bicornutum
- Steinernema boemarei
- Steinernema brazilense
- Steinernema cameroonense
- Steinernema carpocapsae
- Steinernema ceratophorum
- Steinernema cholashanense
- Steinernema citrae
- Steinernema costaricense
- Steinernema cubanum
- Steinernema cumgarense
- Steinernema dharanaii
- Steinernema diaprepesi
- Steinernema eapokense
- Steinernema everestense
- Steinernema feltiae
- Steinernema glaseri
- Steinernema guangdongense
- Steinernema hebeiense
- Steinernema hermaphroditum
- Steinernema ichnusae
- Steinernema innovationi
- Steinernema intermedium
- Steinernema jollieti
- Steinernema karii
- Steinernema khoisanae
- Steinernema kraussei
- Steinernema kushidai
- Steinernema lamjungense
- Steinernema litorale
- Steinernema loci
- Steinernema longicaudum
- Steinernema minutum
- Steinernema monticolum
- Steinernema neocurtillae
- Steinernema nepalense
- Steinernema nyetense
- Steinernema oregonense
- Steinernema pakistanense
- Steinernema phyllophagae
- Steinernema puertoricense
- Steinernema puntauvense
- Steinernema rarum
- Steinernema riobrave
- Steinernema robustispiculum
- Steinernema sacchari
- Steinernema sangi
- Steinernema sasonense
- Steinernema scapterisci
- Steinernema scarabaei
- Steinernema schliemanni
- Steinernema serratum
- Steinernema siamkayai
- Steinernema sichuanense
- Steinernema silvaticum
- Steinernema surkhetense
- Steinernema tami
- Steinernema texanum
- Steinernema thanhi
- Steinernema thermophilum
- Steinernema tophus
- Steinernema unicornum
- Steinernema vulcanicum
- Steinernema websteri
- Steinernema weiseri
- Steinernema xueshanense
- Steinernema yirgalemense

== Use in agriculture ==
Species of this genus can infect insects and are used as a biopesticide to infect agricultural pests. They can be used against a wide variety of species, including weevils, cutworms, gnats and mole crickets.
