= Steinernematidae =

Scientific classification
- Domain: Eukaryota
- Kingdom: Animalia
- Phylum: Nematoda
- Class: Chromadorea
- Order: Rhabditida
- Superfamily: Strongyloidoidea
- Family: Steinernematidae; Filipjev, 1934

Genera
- Steinernema

Family of roundworms

The Steinernematidae are a family of nematodes in the order Rhabditida.

Nematodes of the genus Steinernema are obligate insect parasites that inhabit soil. Xenorhabdus bacteria occupy nematode insecticide and synergistically kill, digest, and consume insect hosts.

Together with Heterorhabditis, Caenorhabditis, Rhabditis, Pelodera, Strongyloides, Bursilla, Cruznema, and Panagrellus, Sterinernema belongs to the order Rhabditida.
