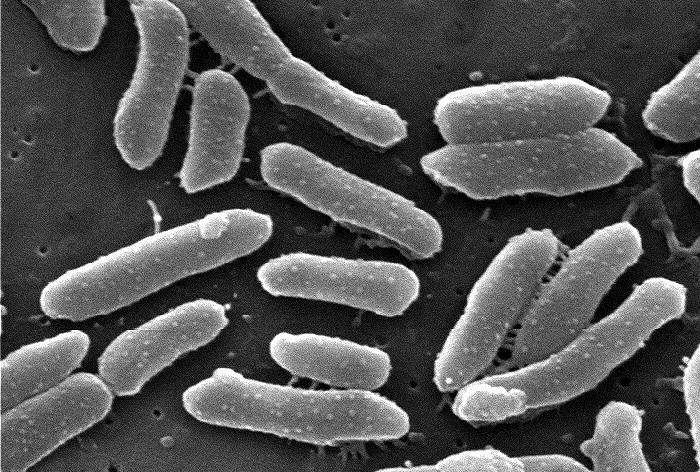
- Providencia alcalifaciens

Scientific classification
- Domain: Bacteria
- Kingdom: Pseudomonadati
- Phylum: Pseudomonadota
- Class: Gammaproteobacteria
- Order: Enterobacterales
- Family: Morganellaceae; Adeolu et al., 2016

Genera
- Arsenophonus; Cosenzaea; Moellerella; Morganella; Photorhabdus; Proteus; Providencia; Xenorhabdus

= Morganellaceae =

Family of bacteria

Morganellaceae is a family of Gram-negative bacteria that include some important human pathogens formerly classified as Enterobacteriaceae. This family is a member of the order Enterobacterales in the class Gammaproteobacteria of the phylum Pseudomonadota. Genera in this family include the type genus Morganella, along with Arsenophonus, Cosenzaea, Moellerella, Photorhabdus, Proteus, Providencia and Xenorhabdus.

The name Morganellaceae is derived from the Latin term Morganella, referring the type genus of the family and the suffix "-aceae", an ending used to denote a family. Together, Morganellaceae refers to a family whose nomenclatural type is the genus Morganella.

== Human pathogens ==
A number of Morganellaceae bacterial species are opportunistic human pathogens, including Proteus, Providencia, and occasionally Morganella in nosocomial settings.

=== Proteus ===
Three Proteus species P. vulgaris, P. mirabilis, and P. penneri are opportunistic human pathogens, most commonly resulting in urinary tract infections. Proteus vulgaris is commonly found in the intestine in various animals, and is shed into manure and soil.

About 10–15% of kidney stones are struvite stones, caused by alkalinization of the urine by the action of the urease enzyme of Proteus (and other) bacterial species.

=== Providencia ===
Providencia rettgeri is a common cause of traveller's diarrhea.

== Insect pathogens and symbionts ==
A number of Morganellaceae have intimate relationships with insects and other invertebrates.

=== Arsenophonus ===
Arsenophonus are endosymbiotic bacteria of various insects. In Nasonia parasitic wasps, Arsenophonus nasoniae acts as a reproductive manipulator by killing developing male wasps. This promotes an increased frequency of females in the population, which are the only biological sex that transmits Arsenophonus to the next generation. This type of interaction is referred to as "male-killing or son-killing."

In flies and lice, Arsenophonus-like bacteria act as primary symbionts faithfully transmitted from generation to generation. In such relationships, the primary endosymbiont commonly supplements the host's metabolism by providing essential vitamins and nutrients that the host cannot synthesize itself.

=== Photorhabdus and Xenorhabdus ===
Photorhabdus and Xenorhabdus are bacterial associates of entomopathogenic nematodes. These nematodes infect insects and regurgitate their Photorhabdus or Xenorhabdus bacteria into the insect blood (also called hemolymph). The bacteria then suppress the insect's immune response, increasing the success of the nematode parasite. As a result of this highly effective evolutionary strategy, entomopathogenic nematodes are commonly used as biological control agents against insect pests like corn rootworms.

=== Providencia ===
Providencia are common bacterial species in the microbiome of Drosophila fruit flies. In Drosophila melanogaster, Providencia rettgeri is a common pathogen isolated from wild-caught flies. The fly immune system defends against this infection using a highly specific antimicrobial peptide that is required for defence against P. rettgeri, but not other Providencia species.

== Biochemical Characteristics and Molecular Signatures ==
These bacteria are oxidase-negative, and negative for arginine decarboxylase and Voges–Proskauer test.

Seven conserved signature indels (CSIs) were identified for this family through genomic analyses in the proteins dihydrolipoamide succinyltransferase, Xaa-Pro dipeptidase, bifunctional UDP-sugar hydrolase (5'-nucleotidase), transcriptional repair coupling factor, phosphate acetyltransferase, histidine–tRNA ligase, and N-acetylmuramoyl-L-alanine amidase. These molecular signatures provide a novel and reliable means of differentiating members of Morganellaceae from other families within the order Enterobacterales and all other bacteria.

== Historical systematics and current taxonomy ==
Morganellaceae, as of 2021, contains eight validly published genera. Members of this family were originally members of the family Enterobacteriaceae, a large phylogenetically unrelated group of species with distinct biochemical characteristics and different ecological niches. The original assignment of species into the family Enterobacteriaceae was largely based on 16S rRNA genome sequence analyses, which is known to have low discriminatory power and the results of which changes depends on the algorithm and organism information used. Despite this, the analyses still exhibited polyphyletic branching, indicating the presence of distinct subgroups within the family.

In 2016, Adeolu et al. proposed the division of Enterobacteriaceae into 7 novel families based on comparative genomic analyses and the branching pattern of various phylogenetic trees constructed from conserved genome sequences, 16S rRNA sequences and multilocus sequence analyses. Molecular markers, specifically conserved signature indels, specific to this family were also identified as evidence supporting the division independent of phylogenetic trees.
