= Stewart's wilt =

Bacterial disease of corn

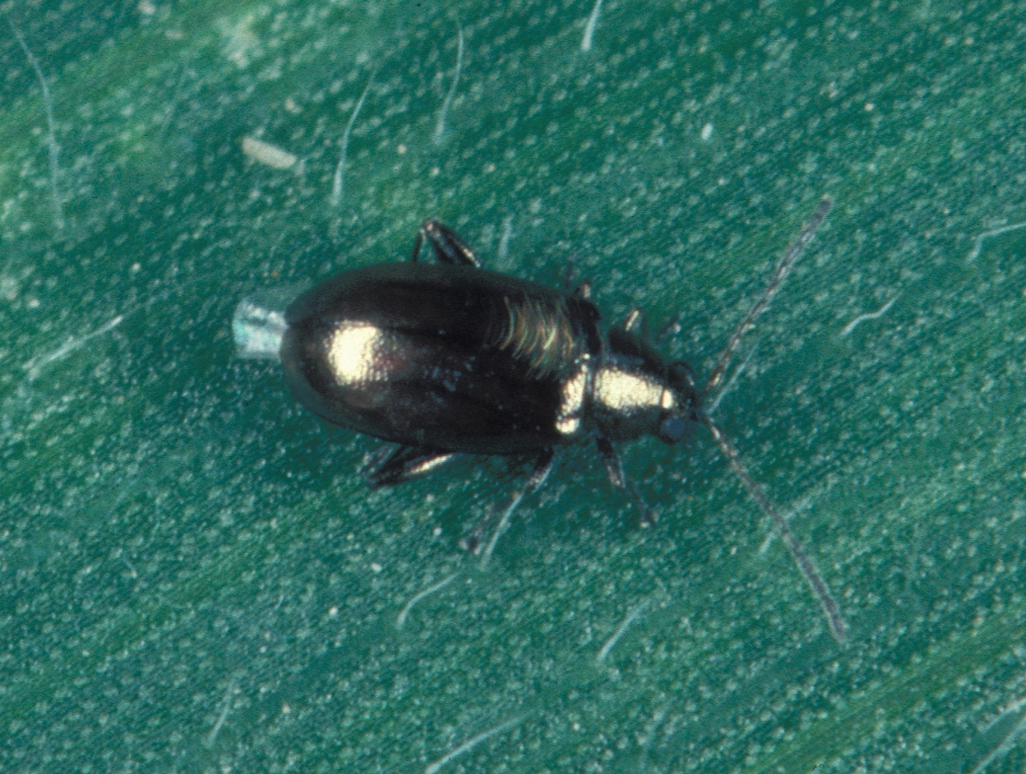
- The corn flea beetle is the vector of Stewart's wilt
- Causal agents: Pantoea stewartii
- Hosts: maize
- Vectors: corn flea beetle (Chaetocnema pulicaria)
- EPPO Code: ERWIST

Stewart's wilt is a bacterial disease of corn caused by the bacterium Pantoea stewartii. The disease is also known as bacterial wilt or bacterial leaf blight and has been shown to be quite problematic in sweet corn. The causal organism is a facultatively anaerobic, gram-negative, rod-shaped bacterium. The disease is endemic in the mid-Atlantic and Ohio River Valley regions and in the southern portion of the Corn Belt. Stewart's Wilt causes minor reductions in field corn yield, despite common occurrence, because most hybrids grown in the Midwest have adequate resistance. However, the disease can be problematic in seed production because many countries have restrictions on maize seed from areas where the Stewart's Wilt occurs.

Stewart's wilt affects plants, particularly types of maize such as sweet, flint, dent, flour, and popcorn. Sweet corn and popcorn cultivars are more susceptible to Stewart's wilt than field (dent) corn, but some dent corn inbreds and hybrids are susceptible. The production of virulence factors can be caused by the communication system between the bacteria known as quorum sensing. Stewart's wilt causes yield reductions by decreasing the size of corn stand or by limiting its production, resulting in fewer and smaller ears of corn.

== Disease Cycle and Symptoms ==
Chaetocnema pulicaria, the primary vector for P. stewartii, overwinters as adults and begins feeding on corn seedlings early in the spring. The bacterium overwinters in the gut of the adult corn flea beetles. Warmer winter temperatures allow for greater beetle survival and in effect, higher populations in the spring. Emerging beetles in the spring transmit the bacteria into corn leaf tissue through feeding wounds. The corn flea beetles wound the leaf and contaminate the wounds with insect frass, which additionally contains the bacteria. When large populations of corn flea beetles are feeding, skeletonization of leaves and death of seedlings can occur.

Stewart's wilt has two phases of symptoms: the wilt phase and the leaf blight phase. The wilt phase occurs when plants are infected during early vegetative growth stages and become systematically infected. Once the bacteria are inside the plant, they colonize the xylem and intercellular spaces of the leaves. When the bacteria reach the corn stalks, the vascular bundles become brown and necrotic. The kernels may also have grayish lesions with dark margins or they may be irregular in shape and dwarfed. Another common symptom of the bacteria is formation of open cavities within the stalk tissue. While the plants are weak and vulnerable, stalk rot fungi can further invade the corn plant. The degree of multiplication of the bacteria is highly dependent on susceptibility of the cultivar. In most cases, the wilt phase occurs on seedlings, but for certain corn types (i.e. sweet corn), more mature plants can wilt. The wilt phase is systemic, meaning the majority of the plant is infected via bacterial movement and colonization of the plant's vascular system. When the bacterium spreads within the plant, leaves begin withering and can die. Plants become stunted and at times, the whole plant may wilt and die. Dwarfed, bleached tassels are common. Often, plants that have wilt symptoms also have leaf blight symptoms.

The second, more common phase of the disease is the leaf blight phase, which occurs on the leaves at any vegetative growth stage. At first, the leaf lesions appear long and irregularly shaped and are light green to yellow and later on, straw colored. On mature plants, yellowish streaks with wavy margins extend along the leaf veins. This leaf blight phase is often prevalent after tasseling and the symptoms look similar to frost damage, drought, nutrient disorders, northern corn leaf blight (caused by Exserohilum turcicum), and particularly Goss's wilt (caused by Clavibacter michiganensis ssp. nebraskensis).

A good way to determine corn has Stewart's wilt symptoms is to look at the leaf tissue under microscope. A good indicator of whether or not the bacteria have infected the stalks is if yellow masses of bacteria are oozing from the vascular bundles. With certain sweet-corn hybrids, yellow, slimy ooze collects on the inner ear husks and/or covers the corn kernels. If the bacterial ooze exhibits non-flagellated, non-spore-forming, rod-shaped bacteria, the likelihood of Stewart's wilt is great.

In certain corn varieties, kernels can be infected later in the growing season after flowering occurs. Although corn kernels can be a source of inoculuum, seed transmission is quite rare. Commercial seed lots obtain phytosanitary certification for Stewart's Wilt by field inspection. The presence of the bacteria in the field at any level results in an automatic fail of the inspection. This causes the disease to be of great importance for producers, as many countries prohibit the import of maize seed from the United States unless it is certified to be free of P. stewartii.

== Environment and control ==
The number of flea beetles emerging in spring from hibernation depends on the severity of winter temperatures. Warm winter temperatures favor the survival of flea beetle vectors and increase the risk of Stewart's disease. The numbers of emerging adults can be estimated by calculating a winter temperature index by averaging the mean temperatures for December, January, and February. If the mean of the mean temperatures is 90 °F (32 °C) or greater, the beetles will survive in high numbers and the disease risk is high; if the mean is between 85 and 90 °F (29 and 32 °C), the risk is moderate to high; 80 to 85 °F (27 to 29 °C), moderate to low; and a mean less than 80 °F (27 °C) represents low risk.

Flea beetles do not survive in the northern half of Illinois due to low winter temperatures. Those found in late spring or summer have migrated from the south. Snow or other winter cover apparently provides insufficient shelter to enhance survival of the overwintering flea beetles. Prolonged periods of wet summer weather are unfavorable for beetle multiplication and feeding, while dry weather is favorable. Consequently, although this disease has been found throughout the world, the bacterium has never survived and spread other than in North America, because the disease depends on where C. pulicaria occurs. In North America, Stewart's wilt is found in the mid-Atlantic and the Ohio River Valley regions and in the southern portion of the Corn Belt. This region includes parts of Connecticut, Delaware, Illinois, Indiana, Iowa, Kentucky, Maryland, Missouri, New Jersey, New York, Ohio, Pennsylvania, Rhode Island, Virginia, and West Virginia. Stewart's wilt can also be found in eastern and midwestern states and portions of Canada, but this depends on whether or not the corn flea beetles survive the winters. Corn flea beetles can transmit the bacteria northward during the summer, but if the insect vectors cannot survive the harsh winter temperatures, then the bacteria cannot be spread. The toothed flea beetle, adult 12-spotted cucumber beetle, seed corn maggot, wheat wireworm, white grubs, and larvae of corn rootworms can also carry P. stewartii from one plant to another during the summer. These pests cannot overwinter and transmit this disease.

All sweet corn varieties are susceptible to wilt in the first leaf stage. Susceptibility decreases and natural control is obtained as plants grows older. External disease control is conducted by insecticide spraying to stop early feeding of overwintering flea beetles. Insecticides should be sprayed as soon as corn first breaks the soil surface. When establishing control measures, spraying should be repeated several times to regulate the presence of the insecticide products in the field. Common insecticides used for control of Stewart's wilt are clothianidin, imidacloprid and thiamethoxam. These insecticides are most effectively used at rates of 1.25 (mg ai/kernel), with clothianidin being the most effective at that rate. Application rates on the labels may vary a little, so follow the label rates for each insecticide. Better results are obtained when seeds are sprayed prior to germination. In furrow spraying and post-germination foliar spraying may not be effective.

Although insecticides are effective, resistant hybrids are the best means of disease control. Hybrid varieties of sweet corn are also available for control. Dent corn hybrids are more resistant to the disease than sweet corn, hence do not require insecticides.

== Importance ==
In sweet corn, losses are as significant as hybrid varieties, but are only used on a periodic basis. The susceptible varieties suffer losses ranging from 40 to 100% when infected prior to the five-leaf stage. The losses are 15–35% and 3–15% for seven-leaf and nine-leaf stages, respectively. Stewart's wilt may add additional costs for phytosanitary regulations from trading partners. Such regulations primarily affect seed commerce by preventing seed from being exported or by creating additional costs for phytosanitary inspections prior to export. During epidemics in the 1990s, Stewart's wilt was a significant economic issue for the corn seed industry because of the logistics of trading and exchange of large volumes of field corn seed throughout the world. Stewart's wilt also creates indirect costs for seed producers - in the same way any important disease does - because resources must be used to screen germplasm and breed corn for Stewart's wilt resistance to develop hybrids that efficiently and effectively control the disease. In Kentucky, the disease causes huge losses for corn producers. Stewart's wilt impacts include stand reductions, production of fewer and smaller ears, and an increased susceptibility of wilt-infected plants to stalk rotting organisms.

== Origin ==
Stewart's wilt was first observed by T. J. Burrill in the late 1880s while studying fire blights in the corn fields of southern Illinois. Burrill associated the symptoms he found with dry weather and chinch bug damage, yet he indicated that bacteria could be the cause for the disease. Nonetheless, he was unable to complete Koch's postulates to determine the causal pathogen of the disease.

Then, in 1895, F.C. Stewart observed wilt in sweet-corn plants in Long Island, NY. After completion of Koch's postulates with the bacteria in sweet corn, Stewart gave an accurate account of the symptoms and named the pathogen Pseudomonas stewartii in 1898. With the help of his colleagues, Stewart concluded that the bacteria were readily disseminated by seed. Another 25 years later, a corn flea beetle, Chaetocnema pulicaria, was identified as the primary vector responsible for the midseason spread of the disease.

The taxonomy of the pathogen was under debate for half a century, when in 1963, D.W. Dye named it Erwinia stewartii. Dye did so because the pathogen is closely related to other bacteria in the Erwinia herbicola-Enterobacter agglomerans complex. Recently, the complex was assigned to the genus, Pantoea, which did not agree with the results from the 16S RNA sequence analysis. Due to this difference, the pathogen was named, Erwinia stewartii, and has most recently been named, Pantoea stewartii.

Stewart's wilt was primarily responsible for the development of the first widely grown, single-cross hybrid, 'Golden Cross Bantam'. In 1923, Glenn Smith, a USDA scientist working at Purdue University, created a hybrid from two different lines of the regular, susceptible 'Golden Bantam'. The hybrid was tested in one of the most destructive epidemics of Stewart's wilt in northern Indiana. After a successful performance, the hybrid was legalized and named 'Golden Cross Bantam'. Within a few years, 70–80% of the sweet corn canned in the US was that cultivar.
