= Mixta calida =

Scientific classification
- Domain: Bacteria
- Kingdom: Pseudomonadati
- Phylum: Pseudomonadota
- Class: Gammaproteobacteria
- Order: Enterobacterales
- Family: Erwiniaceae
- Genus: Mixta
- Species: M. calida

Binomial name
- Mixta calida (Popp et al. 2010) Palmer et al. 2018

Synonyms
- Pantoea calida Popp et al. 2010

Species of bacteria

Mixta calida (formerly Pantoea calida) is a species of Gram negative bacteria. Cells of this species are coccoid rods and are motile.

== Background ==
Mixta calida was originally isolated from powdered infant formula, and in 2010 was placed in the genus Pantoea. In 2018, the species was reclassified into the novel genus, Mixta. The species name is derived from Latin calida (warm, hot), referring to the species' ability to grow well at 44 °C.

Research on infections in humans is limited, but Mixta calida has been reported to cause implantable cardioverter defibrillator-related infection, postsurgical meningitis, and bacteremia.
