= Fructan beta-(2,6)-fructosidase =

Identifiers
- EC no.: 3.2.1.154
- CAS no.: 1000597-62-5

Databases
- IntEnz: IntEnz view
- BRENDA: BRENDA entry
- ExPASy: NiceZyme view
- KEGG: KEGG entry
- MetaCyc: metabolic pathway
- PRIAM: profile
- PDB structures: RCSB PDB PDBe PDBsum
Search
- PMC: articles
- PubMed: articles
- NCBI: proteins

Fructan beta-(2,6)-fructosidase (EC 3.2.1.154, beta-(2-6)-fructan exohydrolase, levanase, 6-FEH, beta-(2,6)-D-fructan fructohydrolase) is an enzyme with systematic name (2->6)-beta-D-fructan fructohydrolase. This enzyme catalyses the following chemical reaction

Hydrolysis of terminal, non-reducing (2->6)-linked beta-D-fructofuranose residues in fructans

The best substrates are the levan-type fructans such as 6-kestotriose [beta-D-fructofuranosyl-(2->6)-beta-D-fructofuranosyl alpha-D-glucopyranoside] and 6,6-kestotetraose [beta-D-fructofuranosyl-(2->6)-beta-D-fructofuranosyl-(2->6)-beta-D-fructofuranosyl alpha-D-glucopyranoside].
