= Erwinia papayae =

Scientific classification
- Domain: Bacteria
- Kingdom: Pseudomonadati
- Phylum: Pseudomonadota
- Class: Gammaproteobacteria
- Order: Enterobacterales
- Family: Erwiniaceae
- Genus: Erwinia
- Species: E. papayae

Binomial name
- Erwinia papayae Gardan et al., 2004

Species of bacterium

Erwinia papayae is a bacteria species causing bacterial crown rot, or bacterial canker, a noteworthy and grave disease of papaya (Carica papaya).

== Importance ==
Erwinia papayae, the bacterial pathogen responsible for the disease, was first identified in 1931 in Java, Indonesia (Gardan et al. 2004), and has since spread to papaya growing countries worldwide—from the Caribbean to South America to South East Asia (Ollitrault et al. 2007). By the late 1960s, E. papayae had appeared in the West Indies, where it obliterated all the yields of the papaya cultivar ‘Solo,’ which because of its high fruit yields and quality was the only one grown in the fields (Ollitrault et al. 2007). Papayas are significant cash crops for the papaya-growing countries because of their rapid generation, high yields, and large market demand both locally and internationally (Ollitrault et al. 2007). In Malaysia, where the disease has plagued farmers for over a decade, papayas have an export value of approximately 24-28 million USD per year (Maktar et al. 2008). With bacterial crown rot affecting approximately 800 hectares of papaya on the Malaysian Peninsula alone (Maktar et al. 2008), this results in a huge loss in profit for the agricultural industry.

== Host and symptoms ==
Although Erwinia papayae has been known to survive on leaves of cowpea, tomato, and rockmelon for a minimum of two weeks, the host range of bacterial crown rot is confined to papaya (Webb 1985). Inoculation with the pathogen of twenty-three common weed species and crops found in association with Philippine papaya fields found none of these species to be susceptible to the disease (Obrero 1980). Symptoms of bacterial crown rot begin as angular water-soaked lesions on leaf surfaces and eventually spread through veins and petioles to cause death to the canopy layer of leaves. Water-soaked cankers also appear on the stem, causing it to collapse, and spread to meristems, killing the growing tips of the plant (Webb 1985; Fullerton et al. 2011; Maktar et al. 2008). Water-soaked lesions can also appear on unripe fruit, and although they start small, the lesions can turn into firm depressions (Webb 1985). Dry conditions can allow infected plants to recover and produce unaffected, fruit-producing branches. Erwinia papayae is a Gram-negative, straight rod bacterium with peritrichous flagella, so diagnosis can be made using a Gram stain. On King's medium B, colonies are creamy and mucoid with a non-diffusible blue pigment (Vawdrey 2011).

== Disease cycle ==
The pathogen can survive in the seed of infected papaya, even after drying, for approximately 30 days (Obrero 1980). Thus far, seed-borne transmission is the predominant method of spread and infection; in fact, studies indicate the pathogen has the ability for long-range dispersal via seed (Ramachandran et al. 2015). Although symptoms can be seen year round, rain and splashing water aid in the transmission and exacerbate the disease (Webb 1985). The bacterium relies on wounds or natural plant openings to enter the papaya. Upon infection by the pathogen, juvenile stem tissue initially shows dark green, water-soaked lesions, which develop into putrid wet rot on the stems (Vawdrey 2011). E. papayae causes a systemic infection—coalescing brown angular lesions spread from the stem lamina to the crown meristems. The firm depressed lesions that progress on unripe fruit penetrate seed cavities. The pathogen does not survive longer than two weeks in soil—instead, the pathogen survives inside the infected vascular bundles of diseased papaya (Vawdrey 2011).
