= Mixta =

Scientific classification
- Domain: Bacteria
- Kingdom: Pseudomonadati
- Phylum: Pseudomonadota
- Class: Gammaproteobacteria
- Order: Enterobacterales
- Family: Erwiniaceae
- Genus: Mixta; Palmer et al. 2018

Type species
- Mixta calida

Species
- M. calida M. gaviniae M. intestinalis M. tenebrionis M. theicola

Genus of bacteria

Mixta is a genus of Gram-negative bacteria of the family Erwiniaceae. The members of this genus are facultatively anaerobic and motile.

== Background ==
Mixta was proposed as a novel genus in 2018, based on a genomic study of members of genus Pantoea. The first four species to be placed in this genus were reclassified from genus Pantoea. The genus name Mixta refers to the "mixed lifestyles of species in genus."
