= Erwinia pyrifoliae =

Scientific classification
- Domain: Bacteria
- Kingdom: Pseudomonadati
- Phylum: Pseudomonadota
- Class: Gammaproteobacteria
- Order: Enterobacterales
- Family: Erwiniaceae
- Genus: Erwinia
- Species: E. pyrifoliae

Binomial name
- Erwinia pyrifoliae Kim et al. 1999

Species of bacterium

Erwinia pyrifoliae is a Gram-negative bacterium and a phytopathogen of Asian pear trees (Pyrus pyrifolia), causing necrotic disease. Its type strain is Ep16/96^{T}(=CFBP 4172^{T} =DSM 12163^{T}.
