= Tatumella ptyseos =

Scientific classification
- Domain: Bacteria
- Kingdom: Pseudomonadati
- Phylum: Pseudomonadota
- Class: Gammaproteobacteria
- Order: Enterobacterales
- Family: Erwiniaceae
- Genus: Tatumella
- Species: T. ptyseos

Binomial name
- Tatumella ptyseos Hollis et al., 1982

Species of bacterium

Tatumella ptyseos is a species of gram-negative bacteria first isolated from human clinical specimens, predominantly sputum. It has been isolated from several food sources including powdered infant formula and pineapples.

The specific epithet comes from the Greek noun ptyseos, which means "a spitting".

== Characteristics ==
Tatumella ptyseos is catalase positive, oxidase negative, non-encapsulated, and non-spore-forming. This organism notably produces a large zone of inhibition around penicillin discs. T. ptyseos usually has one flagellum and is motile at room temperature (25 ˚C). It is non-motile at 37 ˚C.

Tatumella ptyseos produces non hemolytic colonies 0.5 to 1.0mm in diameter on blood agar. This organism grows on many kinds of media commonly used to isolate enteric Gram-negative rods such as MacConkey, Tergitol 7, and eosin methylene blue.
