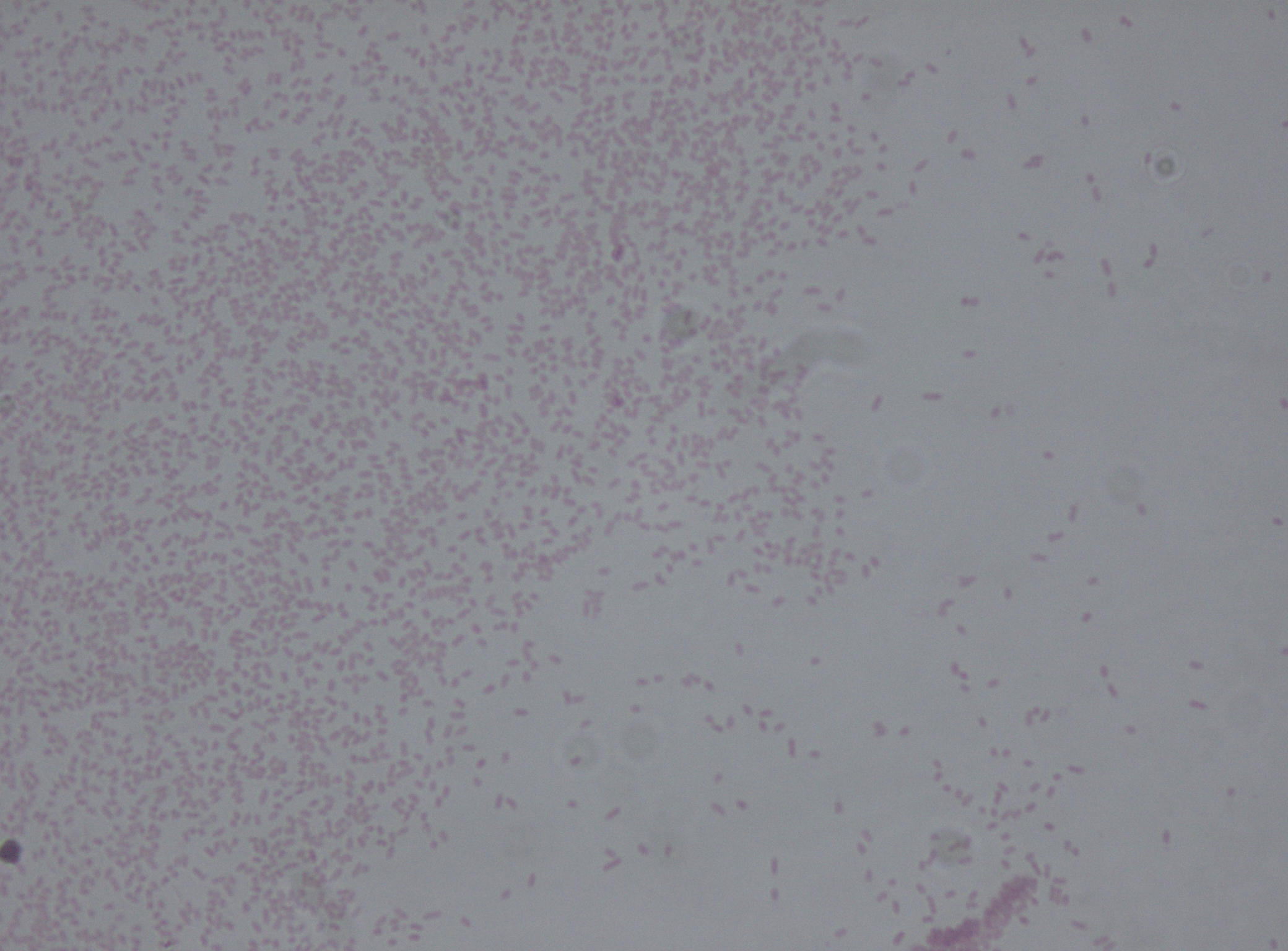
- Gram stain of Pantoea agglomerans under 1000 magnification

Scientific classification
- Domain: Bacteria
- Kingdom: Pseudomonadati
- Phylum: Pseudomonadota
- Class: Gammaproteobacteria
- Order: Enterobacterales
- Family: Erwiniaceae
- Genus: Pantoea
- Species: P. agglomerans

Binomial name
- Pantoea agglomerans (Ewing and Fife 1972); Gavini et al. 1989

Type strain
- ATCC 27155; CCUG 539; CDC 1461-67; CFBP 3845; CIP 57.51; DSM 3493; ICPB 3435; ICMP 12534; JCM 1236; LMG 1286; NCTC 9381

Synonyms
- Enterobacter agglomerans Ewing and Fife 1972; Bacillus agglomerans Beijerinck 1888; Erwinia herbicola (Löhnis 1911) Dye 1964; Bacterium herbicola Löhnis 1911; Bacterium herbicola Geilinger 1921; Pseudomonas herbicola (Geilinger 1921) de’Rossi 1927; Corynebacterium beticola Abdou 1969; Pseudomonas trifolii Huss

= Pantoea agglomerans =

Species of bacterium

Pantoea agglomerans is a Gram-negative bacterium that belongs to the family Erwiniaceae.

It was formerly called Enterobacter agglomerans, or Erwinia herbicola and is a ubiquitous bacterium commonly isolated from plant surfaces, seeds, fruit, and animal or human feces and can be found throughout a honeybee's environment. Levan produced by Pantoea agglomerans ZMR7 was reported to decrease the viability of rhabdomyosarcoma (RD) and breast cancer (MDA) cells compared with untreated cancer cells. In addition, it has high antiparasitic activity against the promastigote of Leishmania tropica.

== Plant disease biocontrol ==
Pantoea agglomerans can serve as a biocontrol organism for the management of plant diseases. It has been used to control fire blight, a plant disease caused by bacterium Erwinia amylovora, that is a common problem in pear and apple crops. After coming in contact with Erwinia amylovora, Pantoea agglomerans produces antibiotic compounds that are toxic to the fire blight-inducing bacterium. It is possible that habitat modification or exclusion (competition) also be mechanisms that make Pantoea agglomerans effective for fire blight biological control.

Environmental factors influencing the growth and spread of Pantoea agglomerans include winter chilling, good sunlight exposure and quality air circulation. Fruit-bearing trees, such as apple and pear trees are common Pantoea agglomerans hosts and during blooming season the fruit-bearing trees receive a period of chilling to revive them from their dormant state in the following spring. In terms of sunlight exposure, fruit trees generally grow best in warm, moist and well-lit environments, thus Pantoea agglomerans must also be able to survive under these conditions to effectively protect healthy plant hosts. Pantoea agglomerans is an aerobic bacterium, so it requires a certain level of air circulation in order to survive.

Pantoea agglomerans has also been used as a biocontrol organism to manage other plant diseases, such as grapevine trunk disease caused by the fungal pathogen Neofusicoccum parvum.

== Insect symbiont ==
Pantoea agglomerans is also found in the gut of locusts. The locusts have adapted to use the guaiacol produced by Pantoea agglomerans to initiate the synchronized swarming of locusts.

It is also commonly found as a symbiont in the gut of mosquitoes. Scientists have created a genetically modified strain of Pantoea agglomerans produce antimalarial effector molecules. Inoculating mosquitoes with this strain reduced the prevalence of the malaria-causing organism (Plasmodium) by up to 98%.

== Plant pathogen ==
Pantoea agglomerans pv. glysophilae completely inhibits root development in Gypsophila paniculata. Both Pag and P. a. pv. betae (Pab) cause gall formation in G. paniculata. That makes Pag a problem for the floral industry, for example in the Israeli industry.

Some strains of Pantoea agglomerans have been identified as the cause of leaf blight of rice in Korea and leaf blight of oats in China.

== Antibiotics derived from Pantoea agglomerans ==
More recent studies have shown that Pantoea agglomerans has a wide variety of antibiotics that can be derived from it. These antibiotics include: herbicolin, pantocins, phenazine and others. In addition, Pantoea agglomerans products may act as a preservative, have bioremediation properties, and be able to fight against harmful pathogens in plants. A Japanese research group was able to isolate the lipopolysaccharide IP-PA1 in Pantoea agglomerans and found that its low molecular mass gives it unique properties. The bacterium and its lipopolysaccharide were also found to induce macrophage activity to regulate homeostasis, giving Pantoea agglomerans therapeutic properties when consumed orally. These properties include effects on: "tumours, hyperlipidaemia, diabetes, ulcers, various infectious diseases, atopic allergy and stress-induced immunosuppression".

== Clinical isolates ==
Pantoea agglomerans is occasionally reported to be an opportunistic pathogen in immunocompromised patients, causing wound, blood, and urinary-tract infections. Infections are typically acquired from infected vegetation parts penetrating the skin. Contaminated intravenous fluids or blood products are only rarely the causal agent. Bloodstream infection can lead to disseminated disease and end-organ infection, mainly septic arthritis, but also endophthalmitis, periostitis, endocarditis and osteomyelitis in humans.

Using the biochemical panels commonly employed in medical diagnostics it is difficult to differentiate Pantoea agglomerans from other species of the same genus or from members of related genera such as Phytobacter, Enterobacter, Klebsiella, and Serratia spp. This has led to confusion surrounding its pathogenicity as molecular studies based on DNA sequencing have disproved the identity of several clinical isolates initially reported as Pantoea agglomerans. For the precise identification of Pantoea agglomerans non-culture based methods such as Multilocus sequence typing (MLST) or Whole-Cell MALDI-TOF MS are recommended.

== Synthetic Biological Circuits ==
MIT Researchers were able to take Pantoea agglomerans and create cells that are one of two transistors (n-type and p-type) or three types of relay strains to make working biological circuits. The transistors can be switched on or off by OC-6, listen for OC-12, and depending on the logic, produce OHC-14. The OHC-14 acts as a signal to the relay strains which can be linked to another transistor cell, much like in a traditional electronic circuit. Using no biological modification of the bacterium, researchers used pass transistor logic to print the various strains onto a flat surface, creating chains of 24 bacteria colonies in agar. Varying the pattern of bacteria printed creates different results, including multi-input logic, demultiplexer, full-adder, and half-adder. These five cell types can be scaled to create complex computational circuits equal to the calculations a modern-day smartphone is capable of.

== Pathogenic variants ==
Includes P. a. pv. glysophilae (Pag) and P. a. pv. betae (Pab).

== Culturing ==
In the course of culture for identification, P. a. pv. gypsophilae can be cultured on trehalose.

== Metabolism ==
Pantoea agglomerans SP1 is able to disproportionate elemental sulfur, as of 2026 the only known member of Pseudomonadota capable of microbial sulfur disproportionation (MSD).
