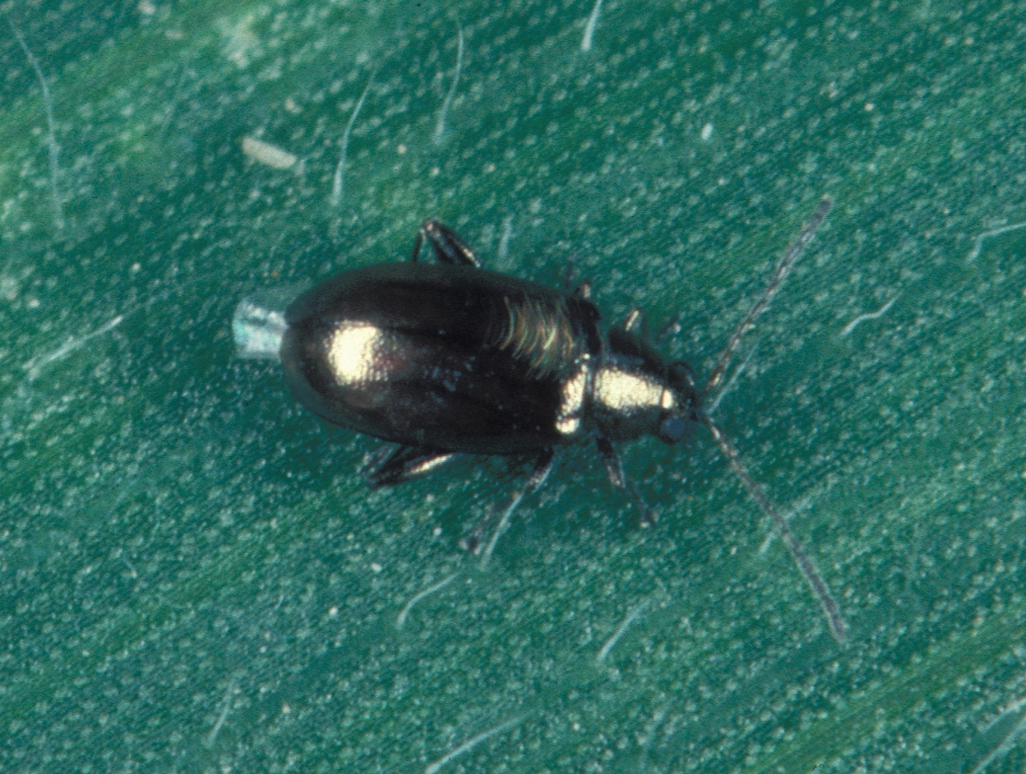

Scientific classification
- Kingdom: Animalia
- Phylum: Arthropoda
- Clade: Pancrustacea
- Class: Insecta
- Order: Coleoptera
- Suborder: Polyphaga
- Infraorder: Cucujiformia
- Family: Chrysomelidae
- Genus: Chaetocnema
- Species: C. pulicaria

Binomial name
- Chaetocnema pulicaria F. E. Melsheimer, 1847

= Chaetocnema pulicaria =

Species of beetle

Chaetocnema pulicaria, also known as the corn flea beetle and clover flea beetle, is a species of flea beetle from Chrysomelidae family, found in Texas, USA and Canada.

== Description ==
The species is black in color, with orange legs and antennae. Their size is quite small, about 1/16 inch (1.6 mm) long.

== Species lifecycle ==
The females lay eggs in soil, which has plants growing nearby. The eggs hatch in 7 to 14 days into larvae. While in their larval stage, their small, worm-like bodies are white. The larvae feed especially on plants' roots, causing serious damage. Then, they transform into pupae, and a week later, into adults.

== Pest ==
The species is known for causing damage to crops. The damaged plants include sorghum, soybeans, sweet corn, small grains, and some vegetables. They feed on both sides of a leaf (upper and lower parts), including epidermis and the veins. They also transmit Stewart's wilt; by removing the leaf tissue from the plant, they open a wound which allows the disease to begin spreading from plant to plant. The disease organism is Pantoea stewartii.
