= Glucose-1-phosphatase =

Class of enzymes

glucose-1-phosphatase

Identifiers
- EC no.: 3.1.3.10
- CAS no.: 9001-38-1

Databases
- BRENDA: enzyme data
- ExPASy: NiceZyme view
- KEGG: enzyme entry
- MetaCyc: metabolic pathway
- Rhea: reactions
- PDB structures: RCSB PDB PDBe PDBsum
- Gene Ontology: AmiGO / QuickGO
Search
- PMC: articles
- PubMed: articles
- NCBI: proteins

The enzyme glucose-1-phosphatase (EC 3.1.3.10) catalyzes the reaction

glucose 1-phosphate
H_{2}O
P_{i}
D-glucose

The enzyme characterised from silkworm and pea seeds hydrolyses glucose 1-phosphate to D-glucose and orthophosphate. In some organisms such as the bacterium Pantoea species strain 3.5.1, glucose-1-phosphatase behaves as a phytase, allowing uptake of phosphate from soil.

This enzyme is a hydrolase, specifically one acting on phosphoric monoester bonds. The systematic name is α-D-glucose-1-phosphate phosphohydrolase.

== Structural studies ==
As of late 2007, only one structure has been solved for this class of enzymes, with the PDB accession code PDB: 1NT4.
