= Chaetocnema orientalis =

Scientific classification
- Kingdom: Animalia
- Phylum: Arthropoda
- Class: Insecta
- Order: Coleoptera
- Suborder: Polyphaga
- Infraorder: Cucujiformia
- Family: Chrysomelidae
- Genus: Chaetocnema
- Species: C. orientalis

Binomial name
- Chaetocnema orientalis Bauduer, 1874

Synonyms
- Plectroscelis orientalis (Bauduer, 1874)

Species of beetle

Chaetocnema orientalis is a species of beetle from the Chrysomelidae family.

== Description ==
The species are gray coloured, and have orange legs and antennae. It is similar to Chaetocnema obesa.

== Distribution ==
The species can be found in European countries like Greece, North Macedonia, and Romania. It can also be found in Central Asian locations such as Caucasus and Turkmenistan. Also it is quite common in the Middle East, in countries like Iraq, Iran, Israel, Syria and Turkey.
