= Erwinia psidii =

Scientific classification
- Domain: Bacteria
- Kingdom: Pseudomonadati
- Phylum: Pseudomonadota
- Class: Gammaproteobacteria
- Order: Enterobacterales
- Family: Erwiniaceae
- Genus: Erwinia
- Species: E. psidii

Binomial name
- Erwinia psidii Rodrigues Neto et al. 1988

Species of bacterium

Erwinia psidii is a Gram-negative bacterium and a phytopathogen of the common guava (Psidium guajava), causing rot in branches, flowers and fruits. Recently, it was demonstrated that this species produces two acyl homoserine lactones (S-(-)-N-hexanoyl- and N-heptanoyl-homoserine lactone), widely recognized bacterial quorum sensing signaling substances, and employed in bacterial cell-to-cell communication systems.
