= Chaetocnema ectypa =

Scientific classification
- Kingdom: Animalia
- Phylum: Arthropoda
- Clade: Pancrustacea
- Class: Insecta
- Order: Coleoptera
- Suborder: Polyphaga
- Infraorder: Cucujiformia
- Family: Chrysomelidae
- Tribe: Alticini
- Genus: Chaetocnema
- Species: C. ectypa

Binomial name
- Chaetocnema ectypa Horn, 1889

Species of beetle

Chaetocnema ectypa, the desert corn flea beetle, is a species of flea beetle in the family Chrysomelidae. It is found in North America. Host plants mainly consist of Poaceae, although they are pests of sugarcane. .
