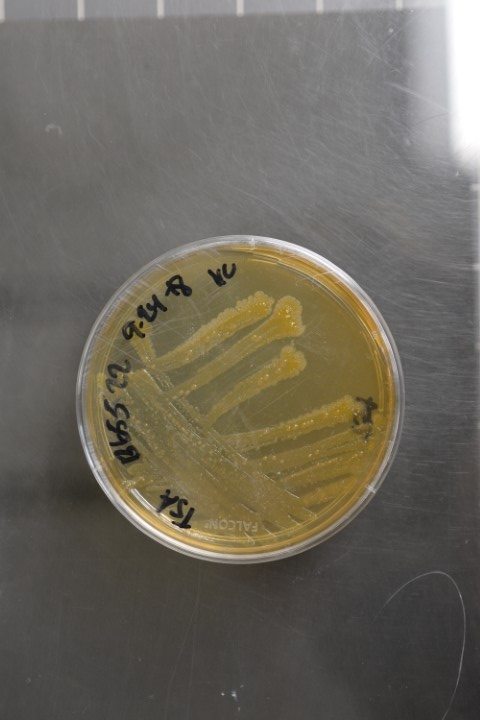

Scientific classification
- Domain: Bacteria
- Kingdom: Pseudomonadati
- Phylum: Pseudomonadota
- Class: Gammaproteobacteria
- Order: Enterobacterales
- Family: Erwiniaceae
- Genus: Pantoea
- Species: P. piersonii

Binomial name
- Pantoea piersonii Singh et al., 2019

= Pantoea piersonii =

Species of bacterium

Pantoea piersonii is a species of gram-negative rod-shaped bacterium from the family Erwiniaceae. It is best known for having first been isolated from environmental samples collected aboard the International Space Station (ISS), making it one of the few bacterial species initially described from space.

== Discovery ==
P. piersonii was first discovered from surface swabs collected inside the ISS as a part of microbial surveillance intended to monitor contamination and crew health risks. At the time of discovery, the authors considered the bacterium sufficiently distinct from recognized genera to justify creating a new genus. The bacterium was thus named Kalamiella piersonii.

Subsequent phylogenetic reassessment of the family Erwiniaceae found that Kalamiella fell within the evolutionary limits of the genus Pantoea rather than forming a clearly separate lineage. As a result, the species was transferred to Panoea and became Pantoea piersonii.

== Phenotypic characteristics ==
P. piersonii is a motile, non-endospore forming Gram-negative rod. The bacterium produces beige colonies with circular and smooth edges. P. piersonii is able to grow at temperatures between 12 and 37 °C, with optimum growth at 30 °C. It produces urea carboxylase and allophanate hydrolase, allowing for efficient colonization of the urinary tract.

== Clinical significance ==
=== Pathogenicity ===
Whole genome sequencing of P. piersonii found evidence of plasmids associated with hypervirulence. Its genome encodes virulence genes involved in adhesion, invasion, and colonization.

=== Human disease ===
Although initially predicted to be non-pathogenic, P. piersonii has been isolated from several clinical sources. The first report P. piersonii from a clinical source was in 2020, when it was isolated from the urine of a patient with kidney stones. Despite being found from a urinary source, the isolate did not produce urease.

P. piersonii has also been isolated from wounds and the blood of an infant with bacteremia.
