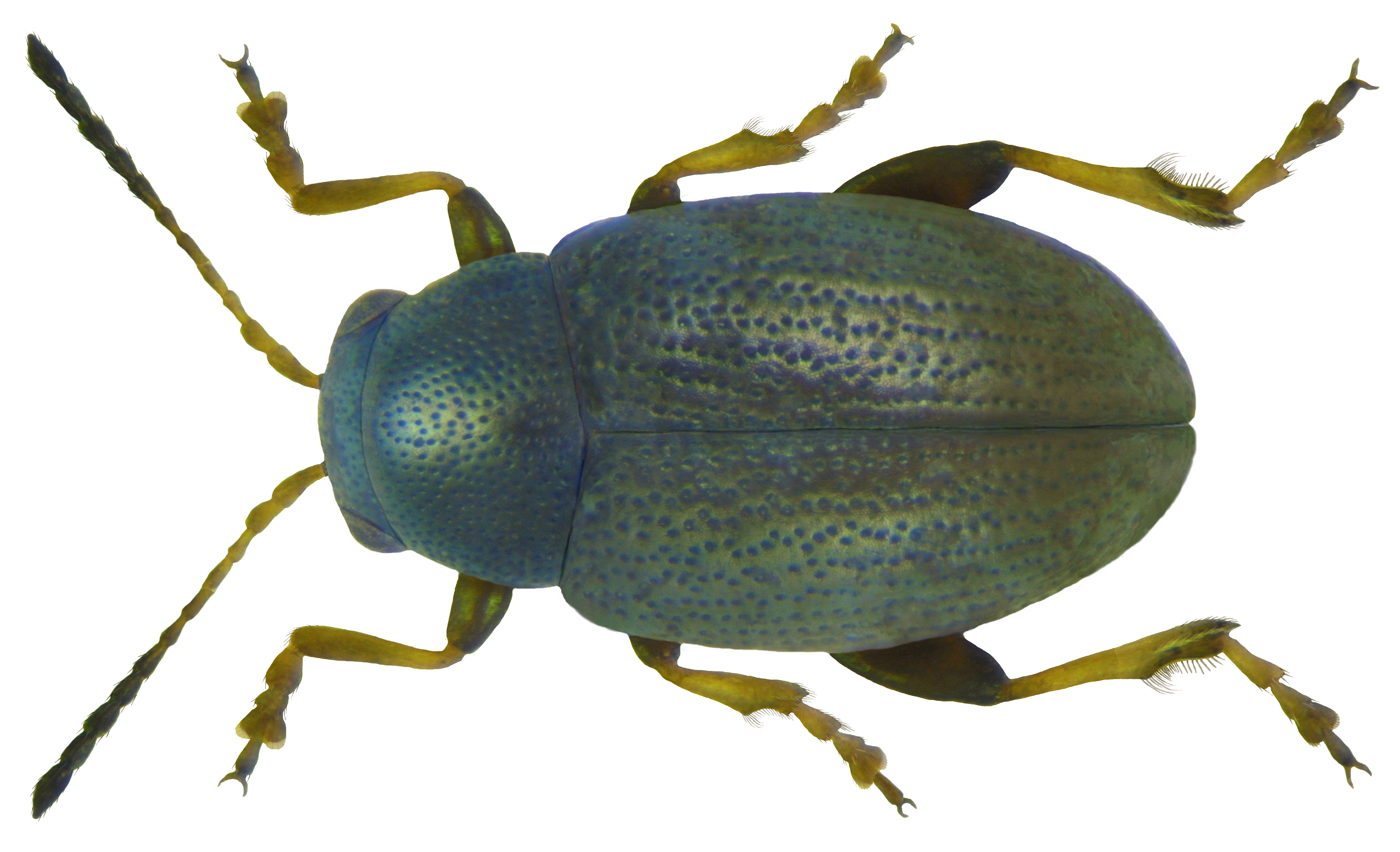

Scientific classification
- Kingdom: Animalia
- Phylum: Arthropoda
- Clade: Pancrustacea
- Class: Insecta
- Order: Coleoptera
- Suborder: Polyphaga
- Infraorder: Cucujiformia
- Family: Chrysomelidae
- Genus: Chaetocnema
- Species: C. hortensis

Binomial name
- Chaetocnema hortensis (Geoffroy, 1785)

Synonyms
- Altica hortensis Geoffroy, 1785; Chaetocnema brenskei Pic, 1910

= Chaetocnema hortensis =

Species of beetle

Chaetocnema hortensis is a species of flea beetle from Chrysomelidae family. It can be a pest of crops.

== Description ==
They are 1.5 to 2.3 mm (0.059 to 0.091 in) long and bronze or coppery, sometimes metallic green, in colour.

== Distribution ==
The species can be found in the Palearctic region east to the Amur region; it is widespread in Europe.
