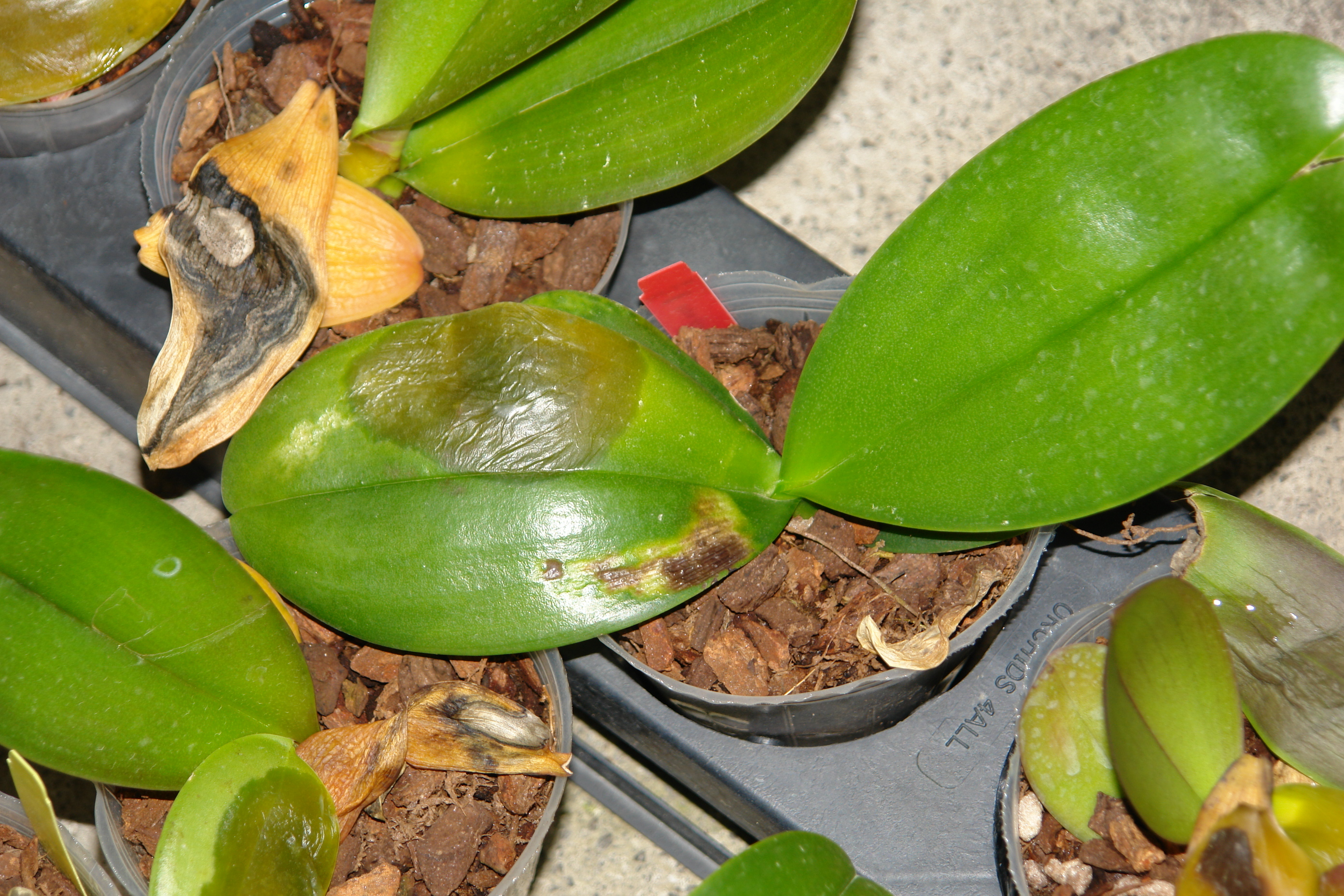
- Orchid bacterial leaf blight caused by Erwinia sp.

Scientific classification
- Domain: Bacteria
- Kingdom: Pseudomonadati
- Phylum: Pseudomonadota
- Class: Gammaproteobacteria
- Order: Enterobacterales
- Family: Erwiniaceae
- Genus: Erwinia; Winslow et al., 1920

Species
- See text

= Erwinia =

Genus of bacteria

Erwinia is a genus of Enterobacterales bacteria containing mostly plant pathogenic species which was named for the famous plant pathologist, Erwin Frink Smith. It contains Gram-negative bacteria related to Escherichia coli, Shigella, Salmonella, and Yersinia. They are primarily rod-shaped bacteria.

Many infect woody plants. A well-known member of this genus is the species E. amylovora, which causes fire blight on apples, pears, and other Rosaceae crops; E. tracheiphila, though, causes bacterial wilt of cucurbits. Other familiar species, such as E. carotovora (another major cause of plant diseases), are more distantly related to the fire blight bacterium, and have been moved to genera Brenneria, Dickeya, and Pectobacterium.

Erwinia aphidocola and E. persicina species were both observed to be present within the floral nectar microbial community of seven different orchid (Epipactis) flower species. E. aphidicola appears to display characteristics of a pathogen as it had decimated fifty percent of a bean crop in Spain in late 2003.

Erwinia rhapontici has been identified as a plant pathogen that produces a distinct diffusible pink pigment on sucrose-peptone agar and creates pink seeds in the hosts. It is also found to be a wound pathogen. Wound pathogens are replicating microorganisms in a wound that can cause the host injury. It is possible that the bacterium can penetrate though young pea pods through wounds or injuries and infect seeds produced in the pod, causing deformed leaves.

Erwinia uredovora is a bacterium from which Phytoene desaturase was isolated, which is the gene that is inserted into golden rice.

== Species ==
Species in Erwinia are:

- Erwinia amylovora (Fire blight)
- Erwinia aphidicola
- Erwinia billingiae
- Erwinia endophytica
- Erwinia gerundensis
- Erwinia iniecta
- Erwinia mallotivora
- Erwinia oleae
- Erwinia papayae
- Erwinia persicina
- Erwinia piriflorinigrans
- Erwinia psidii
- Erwinia pyrifoliae
- Erwinia rhapontici
- Erwinia tasmaniensis
- Erwinia teleogrylli
- Erwinia toletana
- Erwinia tracheiphila
- Erwinia typographi
- Erwinia uredovora
- Erwinia uzenensis

Dickeya dadantii was formerly classified as Erwinia chrysanthemi.
