= Chaetocnema pinguis =

Scientific classification
- Kingdom: Animalia
- Phylum: Arthropoda
- Class: Insecta
- Order: Coleoptera
- Suborder: Polyphaga
- Infraorder: Cucujiformia
- Family: Chrysomelidae
- Tribe: Alticini
- Genus: Chaetocnema
- Species: C. pinguis

Binomial name
- Chaetocnema pinguis J. L. LeConte, 1878

Species of beetle

Chaetocnema pinguis is a species of flea beetle in the family Chrysomelidae. It is found in North America.
