= Levanase =

Identifiers
- EC no.: 3.2.1.65
- CAS no.: 2608508

Databases
- IntEnz: IntEnz view
- BRENDA: BRENDA entry
- ExPASy: NiceZyme view
- KEGG: KEGG entry
- MetaCyc: metabolic pathway
- PRIAM: profile
- PDB structures: RCSB PDB PDBe PDBsum
Search
- PMC: articles
- PubMed: articles
- NCBI: proteins

Levanase (EC 3.2.1.65, levan hydrolase, 2,6-β-D-fructan fructanohydrolase) is an enzyme with systematic name (2→6)-β-D-fructan fructanohydrolase. This enzyme catalyses the following chemical reaction

Random hydrolysis of (2→6)-β-D-fructofuranosidic linkages in (2→6)-β-D-fructans (levans) containing more than 3 fructose units
