= Pantoea stewartii =

Scientific classification
- Domain: Bacteria
- Kingdom: Pseudomonadati
- Phylum: Pseudomonadota
- Class: Gammaproteobacteria
- Order: Enterobacterales
- Family: Erwiniaceae
- Genus: Pantoea
- Species: P. stewartii

Binomial name
- Pantoea stewartii (Smith 1898) Mergaert et al. 1993

Subspecies
- Pantoea stewartii subsp. stewartii Pantoea stewartii subsp. indologenes

Synonyms
- Pseudomonas stewarti (sic) Smith 1898; Bacterium stewarti (Smith 1898) Smith 1911; Aplanobacter stewarti (Smith 1898) McCulloch 1918; Phytomonas stewarti (Smith 1898) Bergey et al. 1923; Xanthomonas stewarti (Smith 1898) Dowson 1939; Pseudobacterium stewarti (Smith 1898) Krasil'nikov 1949; Erwinia stewartii (Smith 1898) Dye 1963

Species of bacterium

Pantoea stewartii is a species of plant pathogenic bacteria that causes Stewart's wilt of corn, as well as jackfruit-bronzing disease, bacterial leaf wilt of sugarcane, and leaf blight in rice. P. stewartii is a gram-negative bacterium in the Enterobacterales, a group that also includes Escherichia coli and several other human, animal, and plant pathogens. Most research on this bacterial pathogen to date has been done on strains infecting corn as the other diseases have been identified much more recently. Due to being relatively easy to work with in laboratory research, P. stewartii has been used to study a range of processes in bacterial physiology including quorum sensing, bacterial pigment production, endoglucanase enzymes, and siderophore-mediated iron acquisition.
