= Chaetocnema rileyi =

Scientific classification
- Kingdom: Animalia
- Phylum: Arthropoda
- Class: Insecta
- Order: Coleoptera
- Suborder: Polyphaga
- Infraorder: Cucujiformia
- Family: Chrysomelidae
- Genus: Chaetocnema
- Species: C. rileyi

Binomial name
- Chaetocnema rileyi R. White, 1996

Species of beetle

Chaetocnema rileyi, the Boca Chica flea beetle, is a species of flea beetle in the family Chrysomelidae. It is known to be found only in a dune system at Boca Chica Beach, in Boca Chica, Texas, United States. The beetles inhabit the stems of sedges in the beachside dunes, while the larvae are subterranean and feed on the underground portions of their host plants.

== Conservation ==
The Boca Chica flea beetle is designated as a species of great conservation need (SGCN) by the Texas Parks and Wildlife Department (TPWD). Spacecraft company SpaceX operates its Starbase spaceport and production facility for Starship rockets nearby, and environmental groups have warned that noise pollution and debris from launches threaten wildlife, including this rare flea beetle. In 2022, the Federal Aviation Administration (FAA) finalized their environmental assessment for the Starship program, and found that Boca Chica flea beetles close to the launchpad could be killed by exposure to high temperatures from engine plumes. In the event of a possible launch anomaly, debris or debris clean-up could impact dune vegetation where the beetle inhabits. SpaceX would later coordinate with the U.S. Fish and Wildlife Service (USFWS) to reduce the environmental impact made from activities at Starbase, and would also conduct an environmental review in partnership with them before Starship's second integrated flight test.
