= Wigglesworthia glossinidia =

Scientific classification
- Domain: Bacteria
- Kingdom: Pseudomonadati
- Phylum: Pseudomonadota
- Class: Gammaproteobacteria
- Order: Enterobacterales
- Family: Erwiniaceae
- Genus: Wigglesworthia
- Species: W. glossinidia

Binomial name
- Wigglesworthia glossinidia Aksoy, 1995

Species of bacterium

Wigglesworthia glossinidia is a species of gram-negative bacteria that is a bacterial endosymbiont of the tsetse fly. Because of this relationship, Wigglesworthia has lost a large part of its genome, leaving it with one of the smallest genomes of any living organism, consisting of a single chromosome of 700,000 bp and a plasmid of 5,200. Together with Buchnera aphidicola, Wigglesworthia has been the subject of genetic research into the minimal genome necessary for any living organism.

Phylogenetic studies suggest that the symbiotic relationship between W. glossinidia began 59-80 million years ago. Wigglesworthia synthesizes key B-complex vitamins that the fly does not get from its diet of blood. Without the vitamins Wigglesworthia produces, the tsetse fly has greatly reduced growth and reproduction. Since the tsetse fly is the primary vector of Trypanosoma brucei, the pathogen that causes African trypanosomiasis, it has been suggested that W. glossinidia may one day be used to help control the spread of this disease.

== History ==
W. glossinidia was first described in 1995 and was named for the British entomologist Sir Vincent Brian Wigglesworth.
