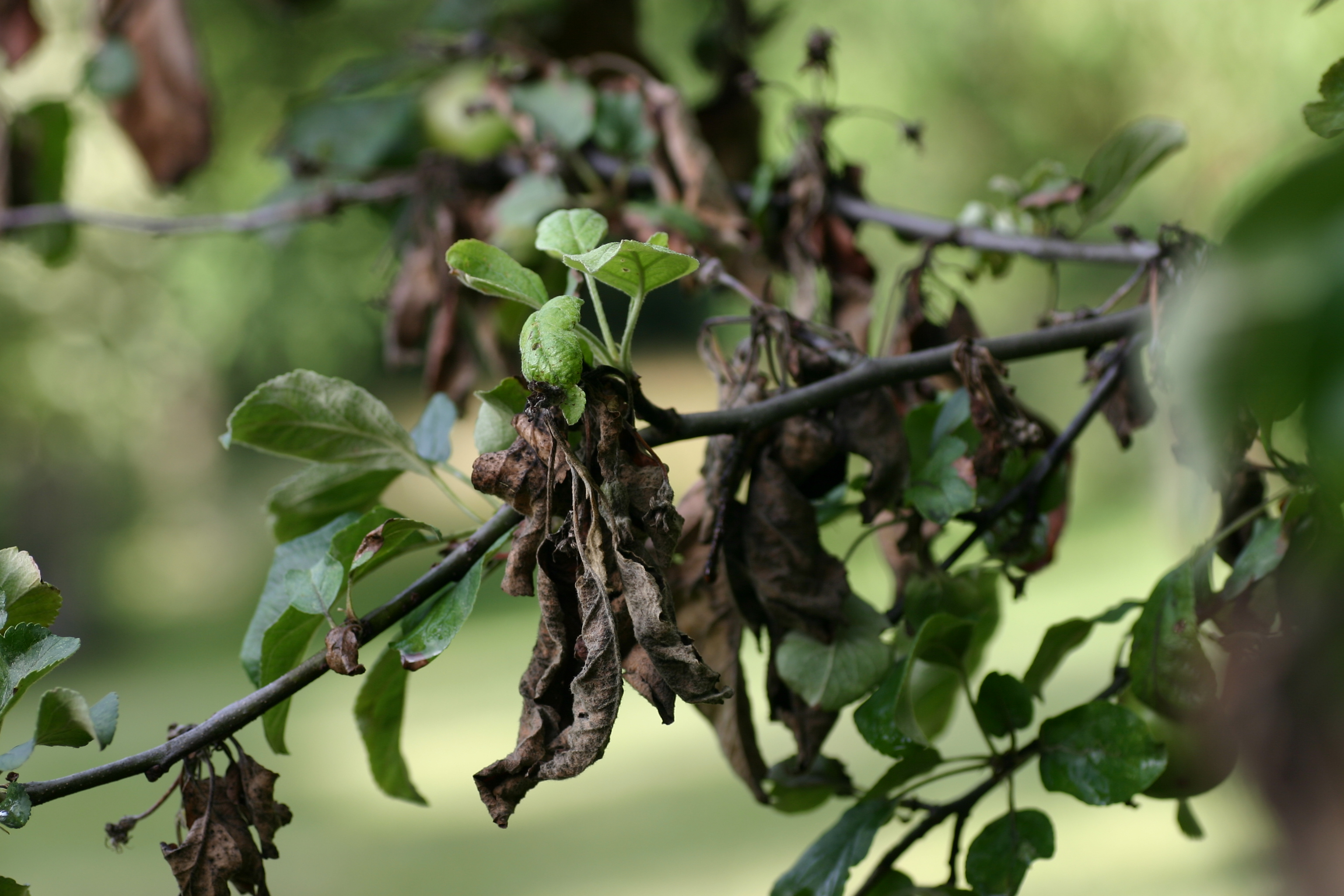

Scientific classification
- Domain: Bacteria
- Kingdom: Pseudomonadati
- Phylum: Pseudomonadota
- Class: Gammaproteobacteria
- Order: Enterobacterales
- Family: Erwiniaceae
- Genus: Erwinia
- Species: E. amylovora

Binomial name
- Erwinia amylovora (Burrill 1882) Winslow et al. 1920

Type strain
- ATCC 15580; CFBP 1232; NCPPB 683

= Fire blight =

Disease of some Rosaceae trees (especially apples and pears) caused by Erwinia amylovora

Fire blight, also written fireblight, is a contagious disease affecting apples, pears, and some other members of the family Rosaceae. It is a serious concern to apple and pear producers. Under optimal conditions, it can destroy an entire orchard in a single growing season.

The causal pathogen is Erwinia amylovora, a Gram-negative bacterium in the genus Erwinia, order Enterobacterales. It is a short rod with rounded ends and many peritrichous flagellae. Pears are the most susceptible, but apples, loquat, crabapples, quinces, hawthorn, cotoneaster, Pyracantha, raspberry, toyon, and some other rosaceous plants are also vulnerable. The disease is believed to be indigenous to North America, from where it spread to most of the rest of the world.

Fire blight is not believed to be present in Australia though it might possibly exist there. It has been a major reason for a long-standing embargo on the importation of New Zealand apples to Australia. In Europe it is listed as a quarantine disease, and has been spreading along hawthorn (Crataegus) hedges planted alongside railways, motorways and main roads.

== History ==
Experiments in the early 1800s demonstrated that E. amylovora caused disease in plants, the first time that this could be shown. E. amylovora was found by Fritz Klement, a German scientist in 1910. It is generally accepted that this destructive crop bacterium initially originated in North America. Today, E. amylovora can currently be found in all the provinces of Canada, as well as in some parts of the United States of America, including Alabama, California, Colorado, Connecticut, Georgia, Illinois, Maine, Maryland, Massachusetts, Minnesota, New York, North Carolina, Ohio, Oregon, Pennsylvania, Texas, Utah, Virginia, Washington, West Virginia and Wisconsin. In the Americas it also occurs in other countries including, but not limited to, Mexico and Bermuda. On the African continent, E. amylovora has been confirmed in Egypt.

It is believed that the pathogen was first introduced into Northern Europe in the 1950s through fruit containers, contaminated with bacterial ooze, imported from the USA. During the 1950s-1960s, E. amylovora spread through much of Northern Europe. Initially large areas of Germany and France seemed untouched by fireblight, but the disease, and E. amylovora, were discovered in the later 1990s in Germany. In the 1980s the bacterium was found in isolated regions in the Eastern Mediterranean and from the years 1995-1996 cases of fireblight began to be reported in countries such as Hungary, Romania, Northern Italy and Northern Spain.

== Dissemination ==
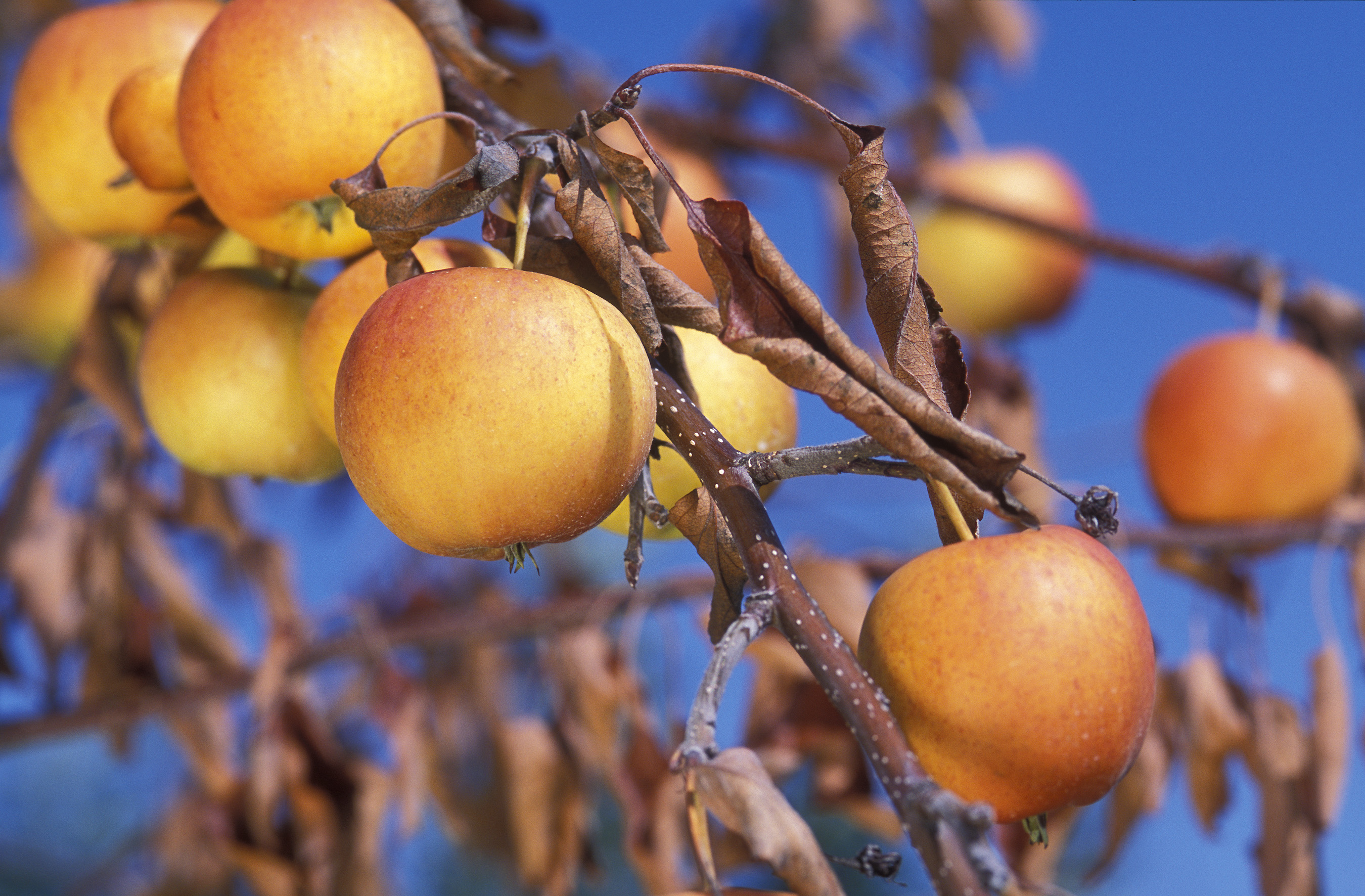
Gala apple branch with “scorched” leaves after a severe fire blight infection.

Erwinia amylovora overwinters in cankers formed during the previous season. In the spring warmer temperatures support development and bacteria-filled ooze begins to exude from the cankers. The factors that determine whether or not cankers become active are not well known, but it is thought that cankers found on larger or older tree limbs are more likely to become active. Honeybees and other insects are attracted to this ooze and can spread bacteria to susceptible tissue, such as flower stigmata. Birds, rain and wind can also transmit the bacterium to susceptible tissue, the colonisation of which will be heavily decided by temperature (21-27 C is most favourable) and moisture either from rain or heavy dew. Bacterial procession into the nectaries – cause "blossom blight". Flowers one to three days old are more susceptible than those five to eight days old. See Curry 1987 for the source and further review of this subject.

Other than through the flowers, the bacterium can enter the plant through the stomata. Also highly susceptible to infection are lesions such as punctures caused by plant-sucking insects and tears caused by a variety of means, including infected cultivating tools. A few minutes of heavy hail can spread the disease throughout an entire orchard and growers normally do not wait until symptoms appear but begin control measures within a few hours.

Once the bacterium gains access to the xylem or cortical parenchyma of the plant, it causes blackened, necrotic lesions, which may also produce a viscous exudate. This bacteria-laden exudate can be distributed to other parts of the same plant or to susceptible areas of different plants by rain, birds or insects, causing secondary infections. The disease spreads most quickly during hot, wet weather and is dormant in the winter when temperatures drop.

The pathogen spreads through the tree from the point of infection via the plant's vascular system, eventually reaching the roots and/or graft junction of the plant. Once the plant's roots are affected, the death of the plant often results. Over-pruning and too much fertilization (especially with nitrogen) can lead to water sprout and other midsummer growth that leave the tree more susceptible.

Unfortunately, while chemicals and meticulous pruning can keep an infected tree productive, there is no known comprehensive cure for fire blight; the best that can be done is to prevent its spread by measures such as avoidance of overhead water systems, as falling water can spread the disease and the careful pruning of tainted stems or branches. Great attention must be paid to any gardening tools that have been exposed to the causitive microorganisms. These tools should be disinfected in an alcohol solution containing three parts denatured alcohol to one part water. Diluted household bleach (one part bleach to nine parts water) can likewise be utilized. Of course, implements should afterwards be dried and oiled to forestall corrosion.

The fly Delia platura has been observed visiting fire blight wounds to feed and can successfully transmit fire blight to already damaged apple shoots. Fire blight exopolysaccharide also served as the adhesive to attach propagated cells to D. platura. D. platura shed fire blight at a constant rate - and did not suffer from doing so - for at least five days.

== Pathogenesis ==
Pathogenicity depends on many different factors such as the production of the siderophore desferrioxamine, metalloproteases, plasmids, and histone-like proteins. However, some essential factors of pathogenicity are variations in the synthesis of extracellular polysaccharides (EPS) and the mechanism of type III secretion system and its associated proteins. EPS helps bacterial pathogens avoid plant defenses, “clog” the host's vascular system, protect bacteria against desiccation and attach to both surfaces and one another. One EPS is amylovoran, a polymer of pentasaccharide repeating units. If a strain of E. amylovora cannot produce amylovoran it will not be pathogenic and will be unable to spread in plants. Levan is another EPS, and a lack of it will slow development of symptoms. Type III secretion systems are used for exporting and delivering effector proteins into the cytosol of host plants. This system mainly consists of Hrc proteins. Motility is another major virulence factor. Since E. amylovora is not an obligate biotroph, it is able to survive outside the host. This fact allows the organism to be spread by such a variety if methods.

== Symptoms ==
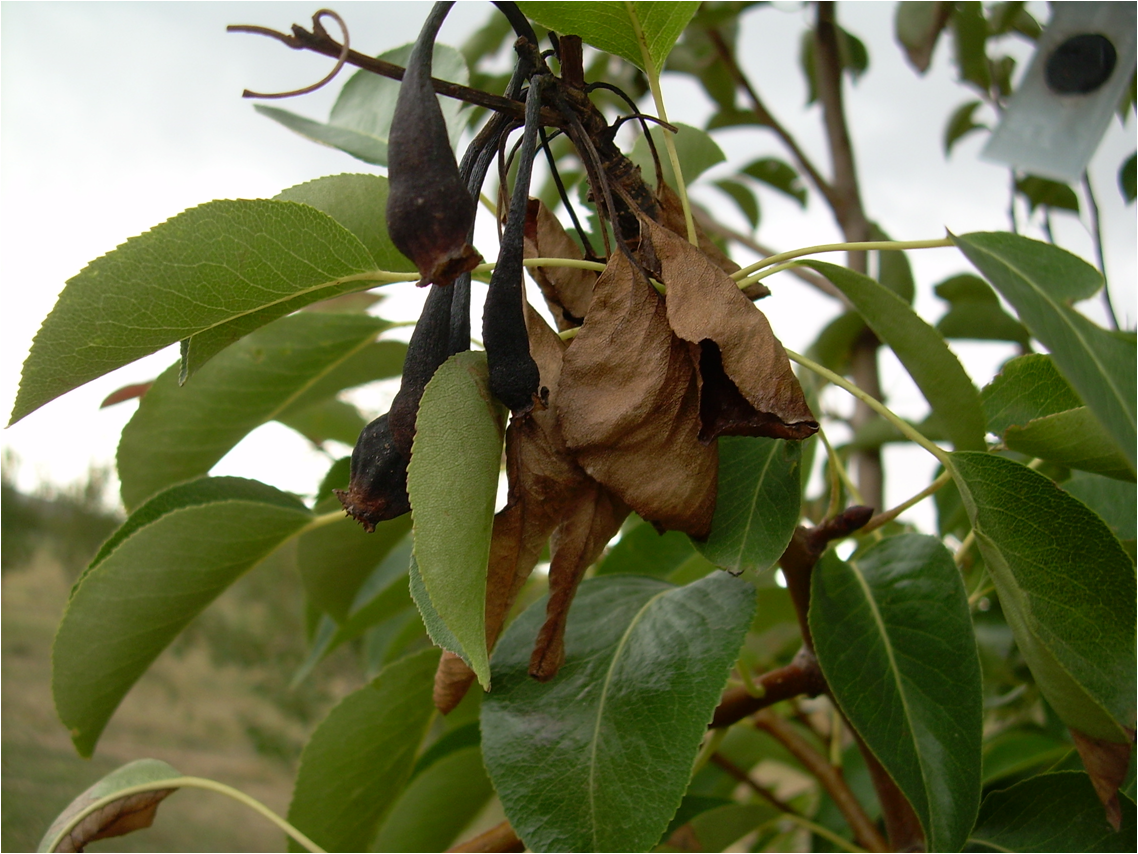
Fire blight on a pear tree caused by Erwinia amylovora

Tissues affected by the symptoms of Erwinia amylovora include blossoms, fruits, shoots, and branches of apple, pear, and many other rosaceous plants. All symptoms are above ground and are typically easy to recognize. Symptoms on blossoms include water soaking of the floral receptacle, ovary, and peduncles. This results in a dull, gray-green appearance 1–2 weeks after petal fall, and eventually tissues will shrivel and turn black. The base of the blossom and young fruit show similar symptoms as infection spreads. Opaque white- or amber-colored droplets of bacterial ooze can be seen on the infected tissue in high humidity. Shoots show similar symptoms but these develop much more rapidly. A “Shepherd's Crook” can occur when the tip of the shoot wilts, and diseased shoot leaves typically have blackening along the mid-vein and before they die. When numerous, diseased shoots give the tree a blighted appearance. Infection of blossoms and shoots can spread to larger tree limbs. Branches will darken and become water soaked, eventually cracks will develop in bark. Wood under the bark will become streaked with black discoloration. Immature fruit forms water-soaked lesions and later turns black. Bacterial ooze can be found on these lesions. Severe infections result in fruit turning entirely black and shrivelling.

== Management ==
In an attempt to prevent new infections, plants have been sprayed with either streptomycin, copper sulfate or both in some parts of the world, such as the USA, but has been found to be effective only for slowing or temporarily stopping growth in already diseased plants. The widespread use of streptomycin spray has led to antibiotic resistance in some areas, such as California and Washington. Certain biological controls consisting of beneficial bacteria or yeast can also prevent fire blight from infecting new trees. The only effective treatment for plants already infected is to prune off the affected branches and remove them from the area. Plants or trees should be inspected routinely for the appearance of new infections. The rest of the plant can be saved if the blighted wood is removed before the infection spreads to the roots. There is no known cure; prevention is the key.

Methods to predict the likelihood of an outbreak so that control measures can be best targeted, were introduced from the 1980s following the work of Eve Billings at East Malling Research Station, UK. These were based on temperature and rainfall, and have been developed further by Billings and others.

E. amylovora generally needs to be destroyed externally, before it enters plant tissues because once it enters the host, it spreads during the endophytic phase of pathogenesis. Once this happens external control methods become ineffective. The application of copper and antibiotics to the plant externally is the most effective method of prevention. Currently it has been noted that E. amylovora has developed a resistance to the antibiotic streptomycin, as do most bacteria able to transfer preferential genes horizontally from species to species.

New research conducted by John C. Wise out of Michigan State University shows that E. amylovora can be controlled with relative efficacy through tree trunk injection of either streptomycin, potassium phosphites (PH), or acibenzolar-S-methyl (ASM). PH and ASM both work through gene inductions of PR-1, PR-2, and PR-8 in the leafy material. Oxytetracycline Hydrochloride (OTC) was also tested and found to greatly reduce the activity of the bacteria within the tree. These new control methods are still being researched and have not been approved for fruit crop production by the EPA.

Phytosanitary measures have been employed as the best sanitary measures against E. amylovora dispersal. High risk countries are encouraged not to import plants susceptible to the pathogen into their territory because, once the bacteria become established in an area it is nearly impossible to eradicate the disease. Nurseries and orchards in such regions are placed on strict phytosanitary surveillance measures and well-monitored. Imported and infected crops are destroyed as soon as they are noticed since the bacteria spreads very rapidly and eradication methods are usually costly and inefficient.

Current fire blight strategies depend upon phytosanitary measures to lessen inoculum in the plantation and the utilization of splash medicines to forestall contamination, particularly blossom infections. Decreasing essential inoculum in the plantation by removing remainder holdover cankers during winter pruning is a set up as a basic method of control fire blight disease.

Slowing the growth rate of the tree will also slow the development of cankers. This may be achieved through reduced watering and fertilising. Controlling insects which cause tree wounds will also decrease secondary infection.

Cultural control options include selecting resistant cultivars, however most commercially successful apple cultivars lack fire blight resistance. Breeders have developed fire blight resistant rootstocks, but resistance is not conferred to the grafted scion.

Prohexadione calcium (BASF brand name Apogee in the United States) is a plant growth inhibitor which is recommended for shoot blight. Since fire blight relies on gibberellin-dependent growth for much of its own life cycle, prohexadione's gibberellin synthesis inhibition effect also suppresses blight. Not effective in blossom blight.

== Importance ==
Besides the historical significance of being the first bacterium proven to be a plant pathogen, fire blight is extremely important economically. Costs for control and loss are estimated to be approximately $100 million per year in the U.S. Specifically, in Michigan in the year 2000, $42 million in losses were estimated because of the removal of about 400,000 apple trees. Warm, humid, and wet weather in May gave rise to this epidemic. In Washington and northern Oregon, approximately $68 million in losses were estimated. E. amylovora has spread throughout the U.S. and much of the world, causing heavy losses, although it so far has not caused severe damage in northern Europe and, as long as E. amylovora is not introduced to Central Asia where wild apple trees still grow, it will not modify any ecosystems. Biodiversity is not impacted either, as no plant species are threatened with extinction due to this pathogen. Growing pears in Emilia-Romagna in Italy is a traditional activity for some families, and fire blight threatens this tradition which has been passed down for several generations. In southern Germany, apple and pear trees have been a part of the landscape for a long time, and are difficult to protect. The decline of apple and pear trees from their landscape can be expensive to replace and could have a negative effect on tourism. In the long-run, fire blight is a very important factor of economy and society.

A relatively small number of apple cultivars are responsible for a large majority of yearly apple production. Food sellers and shoppers prize these cultivars for their appearance, quality, flavour, and storability, while cultivators additionally esteem their orchard attributes and guaranteed market due to this popularity. To maintain the desirable qualities of a cultivar while at the same time changing its disease resistance through ordinary breeding techniques is for all intents and purposes impossible due to the apple's heterozygosity, self-incongruence, and long growth span. Hereditary designing offers an appealing option since it can be faster, resistance qualities can be acquired from numerous sources, the statement of local apple qualities can be altered, and the attractive characteristics of the changed cultivar or rootstock can be safeguarded.

== Association with Asian pear blight ==
Asian pear blight, a disease affecting Japanese and Korean pears, has been associated with fire blight, including in the popular press. Genetic testing has shown Asian pear blight to be a variant of Erwinia pyrifoliae, unrelated to fire blight.
