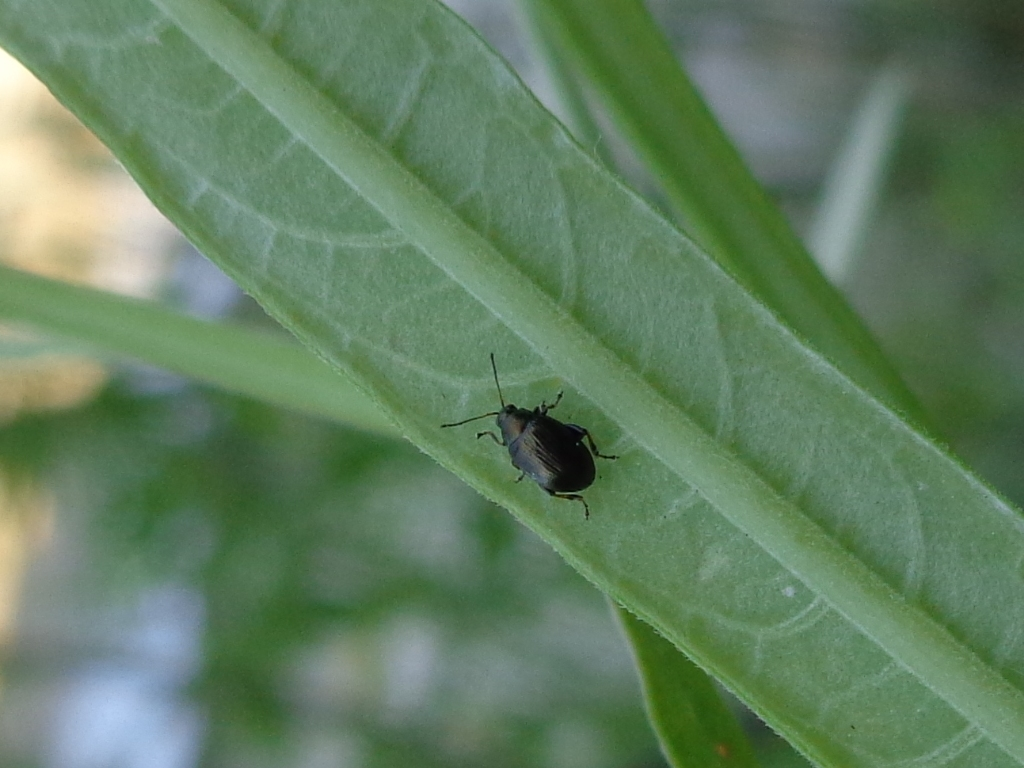

Scientific classification
- Kingdom: Animalia
- Phylum: Arthropoda
- Class: Insecta
- Order: Coleoptera
- Suborder: Polyphaga
- Infraorder: Cucujiformia
- Family: Chrysomelidae
- Genus: Chaetocnema
- Species: C. concinna

Binomial name
- Chaetocnema concinna (Marsham, 1802)

= Chaetocnema concinna =

Species of beetle

Chaetocnema concinna, known generally as the brassy flea beetle, is a species of flea beetle in the family Chrysomelidae. Other common names include hop flea beetle, beet flea beetle, and brassy-toothed flea beetle. It is found in Europe and Northern Asia (excluding China) and North America.

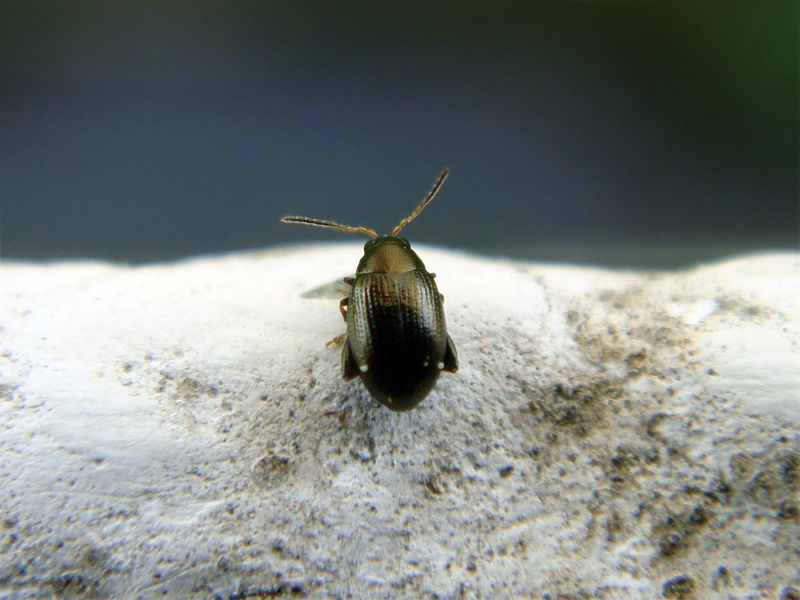
