= Chaetocnema confinis =

Scientific classification
- Kingdom: Animalia
- Phylum: Arthropoda
- Class: Insecta
- Order: Coleoptera
- Suborder: Polyphaga
- Infraorder: Cucujiformia
- Family: Chrysomelidae
- Tribe: Alticini
- Genus: Chaetocnema
- Species: C. confinis

Binomial name
- Chaetocnema confinis Crotch, 1873

Species of beetle

Chaetocnema confinis, the sweetpotato flea beetle, is a species of flea beetle in the family Chrysomelidae. It is found in Africa, the Caribbean, Central America, North America, Oceania, South America, and Southern Asia.
