= Chaetocnema obesa =

Scientific classification
- Kingdom: Animalia
- Phylum: Arthropoda
- Class: Insecta
- Order: Coleoptera
- Suborder: Polyphaga
- Infraorder: Cucujiformia
- Family: Chrysomelidae
- Genus: Chaetocnema
- Species: C. obesa

Binomial name
- Chaetocnema obesa Boieldieu, 1859

Synonyms
- Plectroscelis obesa (Boieldieu, 1859); Chaetocnema meridionalis (Foudras, 1860) [nec (Allard, 1859)]; Chaetocnema insolita (Foudras, 1860); Chaetocnema meridionalis var. unicolor (Weise, 1888); Chaetocnema meridionalis var. corcyrica (Pic, 1909); Chaetocnema jurassica (Pic, 1915)

Species of beetle

Chaetocnema obesa is a species of black-coloured beetle from the family Chrysomelidae.

== Distribution ==
The species can be found in Europe, except in Scandinavia, and Iberian Peninsula. It can also be found in Central Asia, Caucasus, Iraq, Mongolia, Tibet, and Turkey. Its common in North Africa as well, in countries like Algeria and Tunisia.
