= Levansucrase =

Enzyme used in the catalysis of sucrose

levansucrase
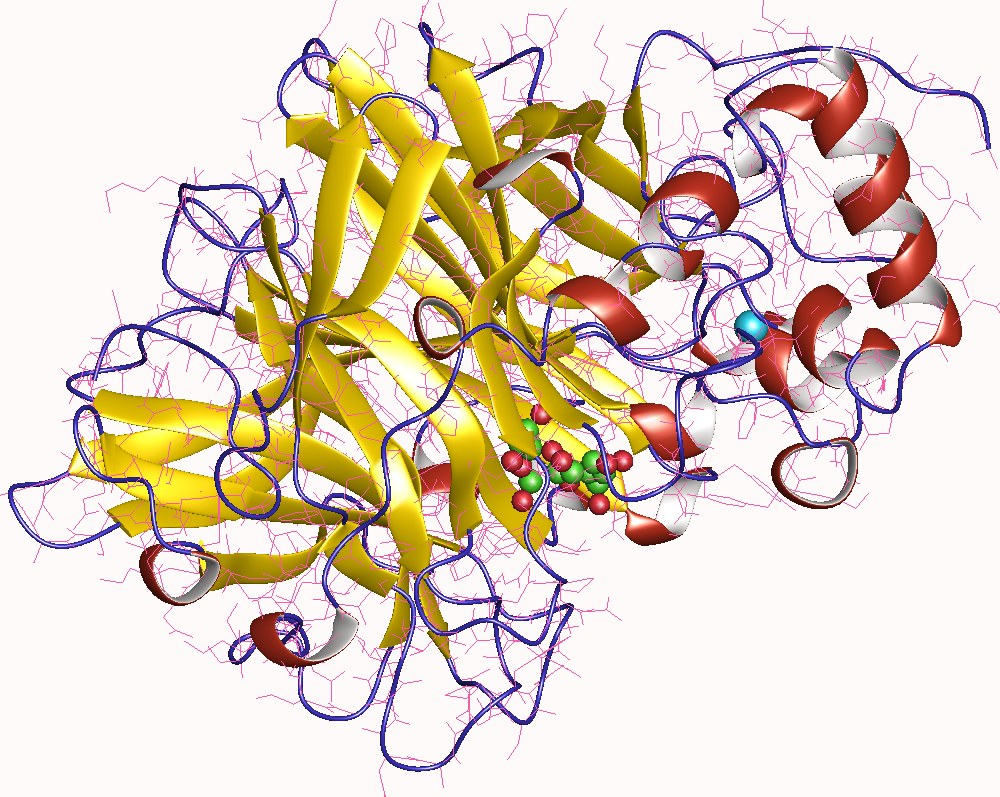
- Levansucrase monomer, Bacillus subtilis

Identifiers
- EC no.: 2.4.1.10
- CAS no.: 9030-17-5

Databases
- BRENDA: enzyme data
- ExPASy: NiceZyme view
- KEGG: enzyme entry
- MetaCyc: metabolic pathway
- Rhea: reactions
- PDB structures: RCSB PDB PDBe PDBsum
- Gene Ontology: AmiGO / QuickGO
Search
- PMC: articles
- PubMed: articles
- NCBI: proteins

Levansucrase (EC 2.4.1.10) is an enzyme that catalyzes the chemical reaction

sucrose + (2,6-beta-D-fructosyl)_{n} $\rightleftharpoons$ glucose + (2,6-beta-D-fructosyl)_{n+1}

Thus, the two substrates of this enzyme are sucrose and (2,6-beta-D-fructosyl)_{n}, whereas its two products are glucose and (2,6-beta-D-fructosyl)_{n+1}.

This enzyme belongs to the family of glycosyltransferases, specifically the hexosyltransferases. The systematic name of this enzyme class is sucrose:2,6-beta-D-fructan 6-beta-D-fructosyltransferase. Other names in common use include sucrose 6-fructosyltransferase, beta-2,6-fructosyltransferase, and beta-2,6-fructan:D-glucose 1-fructosyltransferase. This enzyme participates in starch and sucrose metabolism and two-component system - general.

== Structural studies ==
As of late 2007, 3 structures have been solved for this class of enzymes, with PDB accession codes PDB: 1OYG, PDB: 1PT2, and PDB: 1W18.

SacB counter-selection relies on the toxic product produced by the sacB gene. sacB comes from the gram-positive bacteria Bacillus subtilis and encodes the enzyme levansucrase that converts sucrose into a toxic metabolite in gram-negative bacteria. Plating on sucrose medium will select for cells that contain constructs that have lost the sacB gene.
