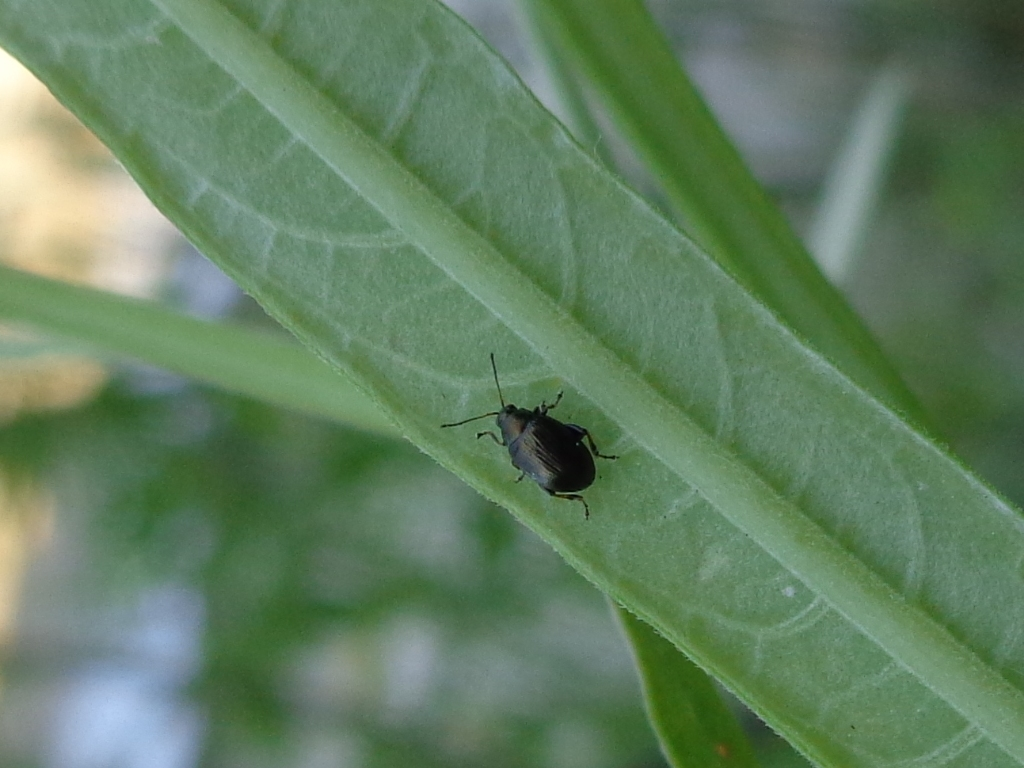
- Chaetocnema concinna

Scientific classification
- Kingdom: Animalia
- Phylum: Arthropoda
- Class: Insecta
- Order: Coleoptera
- Suborder: Polyphaga
- Infraorder: Cucujiformia
- Family: Chrysomelidae
- Subfamily: Galerucinae
- Tribe: Alticini
- Genus: Chaetocnema; Stephens, 1831

= Chaetocnema =

Genus of beetles

Chaetocnema cf. concinna

Chaetocnema is a genus of flea beetles in the family Chrysomelidae. There are some 470 described species worldwide.

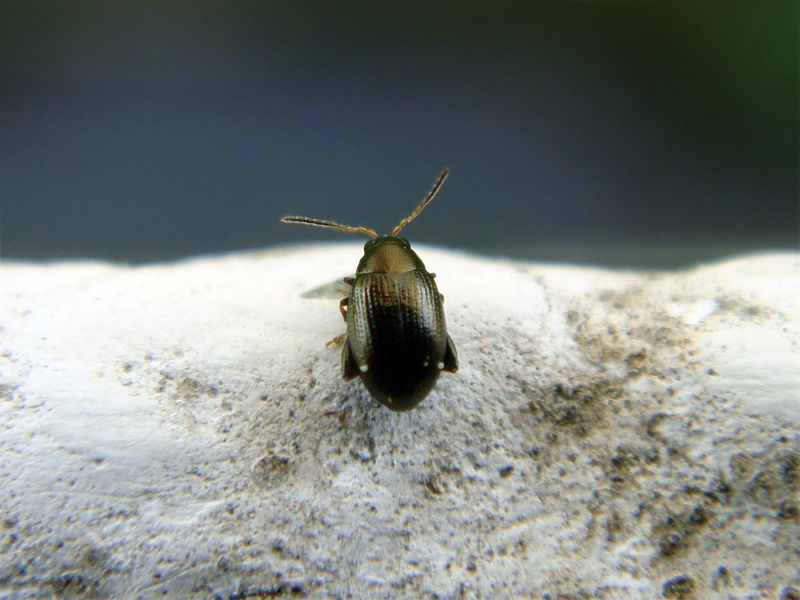
Chaetocnema concinna

== Selected species ==
- Chaetocnema acuminata R. White, 1996
- Chaetocnema acupunctata R. White, 1996
- Chaetocnema aequabilis R. White, 1996
- Chaetocnema albiventris R. White, 1996
- Chaetocnema alutacea Crotch, 1873
- Chaetocnema anisota R. White, 1996
- Chaetocnema arizonica R. White, 1996
- Chaetocnema basalis Baly, 1877
- Chaetocnema bicolor Gentner, 1928
- Chaetocnema blatchleyi Csiki in Heikertinger and Csiki, 1940
- Chaetocnema borealis R. White, 1996
- Chaetocnema brunnescens Horn, 1889 (buttonwood flea beetle)
- Chaetocnema californica R. White, 1996
- Chaetocnema coacta R. White, 1996
- Chaetocnema concinna (Marsham, 1802) (brassy flea beetle)
- Chaetocnema confinis Crotch, 1873 (sweetpotato flea beetle)
- Chaetocnema costata Fall in Fall and Cockerell, 1907
- Chaetocnema crenulata Crotch, 1873
- Chaetocnema cribrata J. L. LeConte, 1878
- Chaetocnema cribrifrons J. L. LeConte, 1879
- Chaetocnema densa R. White, 1996
- Chaetocnema denticulata (Illiger, 1807) (toothed flea beetle)
- Chaetocnema difficilis R. White, 1996
- Chaetocnema dispar Horn, 1889
- Chaetocnema ectypa Horn, 1889 (desert corn flea beetle)
- Chaetocnema elongatula Crotch, 1873
- Chaetocnema enigmatica R. White, 1996
- Chaetocnema extenuata R. White, 1996
- Chaetocnema floridana Blatchley, 1923
- Chaetocnema fulvida R. White, 1996
- Chaetocnema fuscata R. White, 1996
- Chaetocnema gentneri Csiki in Heikertinger and Csiki, 1940
- Chaetocnema hortensis (Geoffroy, 1785)
- Chaetocnema irregularis J. L. LeConte, 1857
- Chaetocnema labiosa R. White, 1996
- Chaetocnema livida R. White, 1996
- Chaetocnema magnipunctata Gentner, 1928
- Chaetocnema megachora R. White, 1996
- Chaetocnema megasticta R. White, 1996
- Chaetocnema minitruncata R. White, 1996
- Chaetocnema minuta F. E. Melsheimer, 1847
- Chaetocnema obesula J. L. LeConte, 1878
- Chaetocnema obliterata R. White, 1996
- Chaetocnema opacula J. L. LeConte, 1878
- Chaetocnema opulenta Horn, 1889
- Chaetocnema ordinata R. White, 1996
- Chaetocnema orientalis Bauduer, 1874
- Chaetocnema perturbata Horn, 1889
- Chaetocnema pinguis J. L. LeConte, 1878
- Chaetocnema producta R. White, 1996
- Chaetocnema prolata R. White, 1996
- Chaetocnema protensa J. L. LeConte, 1878
- Chaetocnema pulicaria F. E. Melsheimer, 1847 (corn flea beetle)
- Chaetocnema quadricollis Schwarz, 1878
- Chaetocnema repens McCrea, 1973 (dichondra flea beetle)
- Chaetocnema rileyi R. White, 1996 (Boca Chica flea beetle)
- Chaetocnema serpentina R. White, 1996
- Chaetocnema subconvexa R. White, 1996
- Chaetocnema subviridis J. L. LeConte, 1859
- Chaetocnema texana Crotch, 1873
- Chaetocnema truncata R. White, 1996
- Chaetocnema vesca R. White, 1996
