= Chaetocnema denticulata =

Conservation status
- Unranked (NatureServe)

Scientific classification
- Kingdom: Animalia
- Phylum: Arthropoda
- Class: Insecta
- Order: Coleoptera
- Suborder: Polyphaga
- Infraorder: Cucujiformia
- Family: Chrysomelidae
- Tribe: Alticini
- Genus: Chaetocnema
- Species: C. denticulata

Binomial name
- Chaetocnema denticulata (Illiger, 1807)

Synonyms
- Haltica denticulata Illiger 1807

Species of beetle

Chaetocnema denticulata, the toothed flea beetle or toothed fleabeetle, is a species of flea beetle in the family Chrysomelidae. It is widespread in the United States and also occurs in eastern Canada.

== Description ==
Thorax with no features: elytra with dents. Mid and rear segment with teeth.
