= Monocerin =

Names
- Preferred IUPAC name (2S,3aR,9bR)-6-Hydroxy-7,8-dimethoxy-2-propyl-2,3,3a,9b-tetrahydro-5H-furo[3,2-c][2]benzopyran-5-one

Identifiers
CAS Number	30270-60-1
3D model (JSmol)	Interactive image
ChEBI	CHEBI:70148
ChEMBL	ChEMBL488513
ChemSpider	83301
PubChem CID	92267
UNII	G7C424U3DJ
CompTox Dashboard (EPA)	DTXSID70184361
- InChI: Key: VAYQNUBOZLPGDH-OLXJLDBKSA-N; InChI=1S/C16H20O6/c1-4-5-8-6-11-14(21-8)9-7-10(19-2)15(20-3)13(17)12(9)16(18)22-11/h7-8,11,14,17H,4-6H2,1-3H3/t8-,11+,14+/m0/s1
- SMILES: O=C3O[C@H]1[C@H](O[C@@H](CCC)C1)c2c3c(O)c(OC)c(OC)c2

Properties
Chemical formula	C_{16}H_{20}O_{6}
Molar mass	308.33 g/mol
- Except where otherwise noted, data are given for materials in their standard state (at 25 °C [77 °F], 100 kPa). Infobox references

Monocerin is a dihydroisocoumarin and a polyketide metabolite that originates from various fungal species. It has been shown to display antifungal, plant pathogenic, and insecticidal characteristics. Monocerin has been isolated from Dreschlera monoceras, D. ravenelii, Exserohilum turcicum, and Fusarium larvarum.

== Biosynthesis ==
Polyketide synthases (PKSs) of fungi are Type I PKSs. Monocerin has been confirmed by biosynthesis studies to have heptaketide origins. Monocerin PKS produces an intermediate with initially a high degree of reductive modification but ends with a classical β-polyketide moiety. Dihydroisocoumarin is the first PKS-free intermediate which would be formed from the reduced heptaketide whose assembly pathway is shown in figure 1. Ketosynthase, ketoreductase, dehydrates, enol reductases and cyclisases are shown as domains of the Monocerin PKS and methyl transferase is considered to be a tailoring enzyme.

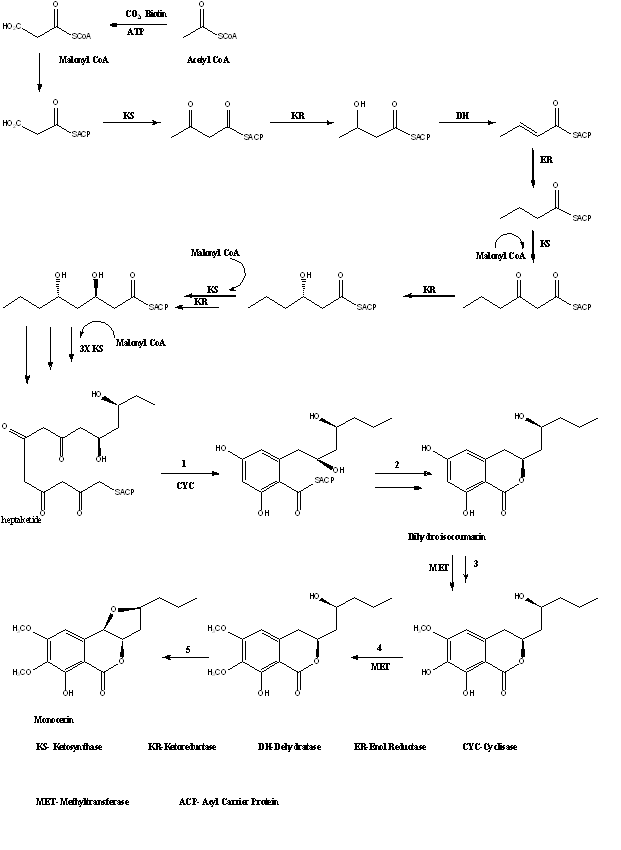
Figure 1. Biosyntheis of Monocerin

1. Formation of an enolate ion on the carbon three carbons away from sulfur allows aldol addition onto the carbonyl six carbons distant along the chain. This produces the secondary alcohol. Dehydration proceeds to give the alkene. Enolization then occurs to reach the stability of the aromatic ring.
2. The modified chain is transferred to the TE domain. This will allow lactonization and release from the enzyme.
3. Hydroxylation occurs at ortho-position to two substituents. O-methylation occurs.
4. O-methylation
5. Cyclic-ether formation

== Biological effects ==
Monocerin produced by Exserohilum turcicum causes Northern Corn Leaf blight disease in maize. The maize will develop brown lesions on its leaves and will have decreased viability in its root cap cells. Monocerin has also been shown to be an effective insecticide against wooly aphids. Monocerin is also an effective herbicide against Johnson grass by inhibiting seedling growth. It has a lesser effect against cucumber.

== See also ==
- Polyketide synthase
- Fungicide use in the United States
- Setosphaeria turcica
