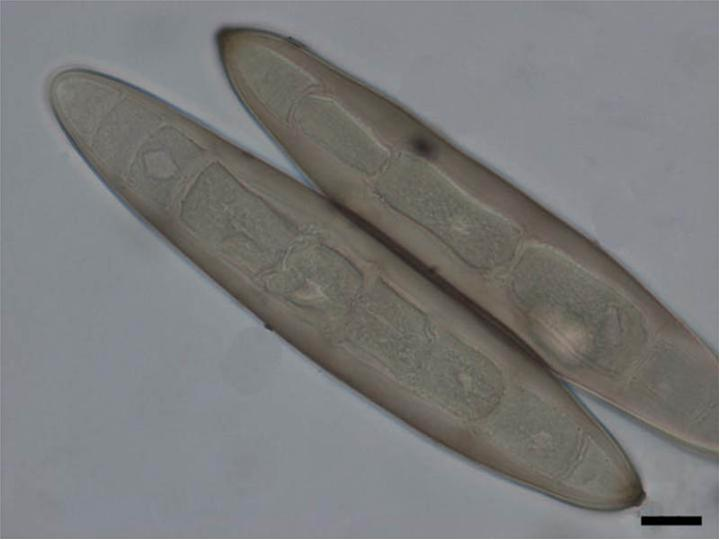

Scientific classification
- Domain: Eukaryota
- Kingdom: Fungi
- Division: Ascomycota
- Class: Dothideomycetes
- Order: Pleosporales
- Family: Pleosporaceae
- Genus: Setosphaeria
- Species: S. turcica

Binomial name
- Setosphaeria turcica (Luttr.) K.J. Leonard & Suggs, (1974)

Synonyms
- Bipolaris turcica (Pass.) Shoemaker, (1959); Drechslera turcica (Pass.) Subram. & B.L. Jain, (1966); Exserohilum turcicum (Pass.) K.J. Leonard & Suggs, (1974); Helminthosporium inconspicuum Cooke & Ellis, (1878); Helminthosporium turcicum Pass., (1876); Keissleriella turcica (Luttr.) Arx, Gen. (1970); Luttrellia turcica (Pass.) Khokhr. [as 'Lutrellia'], (1978); Trichometasphaeria turcica Luttr., (1958)

= Setosphaeria turcica =

Species of fungus

Setosphaeria turcica (anamorph Exserohilum turcicum; formerly known as Helminthosporium turcicum) is the causal agent of northern corn leaf blight in maize. It is a serious fungal disease prevalent in cooler climates and tropical highlands wherever corn is grown. It is characterized by large cigar shaped necrotic lesions that develop on the leaves due to the polyketide metabolite monocerin.

== Races ==
Races of S. turcica are named for the maize R genes which are not effective against them. For example, the maize gene Ht1 does not confer resistance against a Race 1 isolate, while genes Ht2 and/or Ht3 do. In contrast, genes Ht2 and HtN do not confer resistance against a Race 2N isolate, while gene Ht1 does. Isolates which do not overcome any known R gene are termed Race 0.

Race 1, which overcomes the Ht1 resistance gene, was originally discovered in Hawaii in 1973. By the time it was first noted in the continental United States, in Indiana in 1980, it was already quite prevalent across the entire state. Genotyping of isolates sampled from the eastern United States later revealed that while Race 0 was predominant in the mid-1970s, Race 1 spread rapidly, becoming the most prevalent race in the region by the mid-1990s.

== Mating type ==
S. turcica is a heterothallic fungus, meaning that a single isolate cannot mate with itself. Instead, two isolates with complementary mating type genes are required for sexual reproduction. The "perfect stage" (sexual stage or teleomorph) was first described in 1958. A single mating-type locus was identified the next year

The mating-type locus of S. turcica follows the same naming convention as other filamentous ascomycetes: the locus is known as MAT1, while the two idiomorphs (genes at this locus which are not alleles, as they do not derive from a common ancestor) are known as MAT1-1 and MAT1-2

Genotyping of S. turcica populations has shown that sexual reproduction in a given population might be commonplace, extremely rare, or anywhere in between. Genotyping of 264 isolates of S. turcica from temperate and tropical regions found that tropical populations had very high genetic diversity, an equal proportion of the two mating types, and low amounts of linkage disequilibrium between different genetic loci, all suggestive of frequent sexual mating and recombination. In temperate populations, in contrast, there was low genetic diversity, high amounts of linkage disequilibrium, and a single dominant mating type, which suggests infrequent sexual mating.
