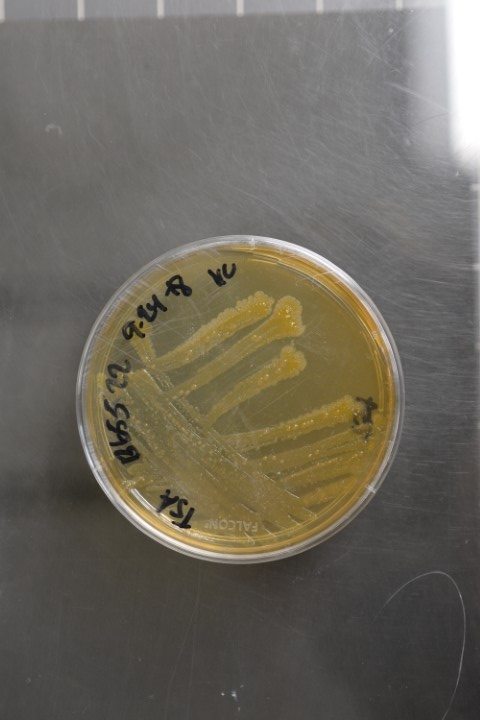
- Pantoea piersonii, formerly Kalamiella piersonii on agar plate

Scientific classification
- Domain: Bacteria
- Kingdom: Pseudomonadati
- Phylum: Pseudomonadota
- Class: Gammaproteobacteria
- Order: Enterobacterales
- Family: Erwiniaceae
- Genus: Pantoea; Gavini et al. 1989

Type species
- Pantoea agglomerans

Species
- P. agglomerans P. ananatis P. citrea P. dispersa P. punctata P. stewartii P. terrea P. septica P. tagorei P. vagans

Synonyms
- Kalamiella Singh et al. 2019

= Pantoea =

Genus of bacteria

Pantoea is a genus of Gram-negative bacteria of the family Erwiniaceae, recently separated from the genus Enterobacter. This genus includes at least 20 species. Pantoea bacteria are yellow pigmented, ferment lactose, are motile, and form mucoid colonies. Some species show quorum sensing ability that could drive different gene expression, hence controlling certain physiological activities. Levan polysaccharide produced by Pantoea agglomerans ZMR7 was reported to decrease the viability of rhabdomyosarcoma (RD) and breast cancer (MDA) cells compared with untreated cancer cells. In addition, it has high antiparasitic activity against the promastigote of Leishmania tropica.

== Species ==
- Pantoea agglomerans is the most common Pantoea species recovered from humans and an opportunistic pathogen associated with contaminated catheters and penetrating trauma. It was formerly known as Erwinia herbicola or Enterobacter agglomerans.
- Pantoea allii
- Pantoea ananatis formerly Erwinia ananas
- Pantoea anthophila
- Pantoea brenneri
- Pantoea citrea
- Pantoea coffeiphila
- Pantoea conspicua
- Pantoea cypripedii
- Pantoea deleyi
- Pantoea dispersa
- Pantoea eucalyptii
- Pantoea eucrina
- Pantoea gaviniae
- Pantoea graminicola
- Pantoea intestinalis
- Pantoea leporis
- Pantoea phosphatylitica
- Pantoea phyllosphaerae
- Pantoea phytostimulans
- Pantoea piersonii
- Pantoea punctata
- Pantoea rodasii
- Pantoea rwandensis
- Pantoea septica
- Pantoea stewartii
- Pantoea terra
- Pantoea theicola
- Pantoea trifolii
- Pantoea vagans
- Pantoea wallisii

The genus contains several more proposed species, such as Pantoea phytobeneficialis, which are currently not considered as validly published under the ICNP.
