= Levan polysaccharide =

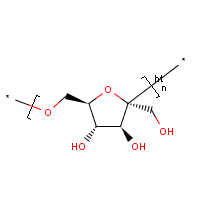

Names
- Other names Polyfructose

Identifiers
CAS Number	9013-95-0
ChEBI	CHEBI:16703
ChemSpider	17216231
KEGG	C06215
- Except where otherwise noted, data are given for materials in their standard state (at 25 °C [77 °F], 100 kPa). verify (what is ?) Infobox references

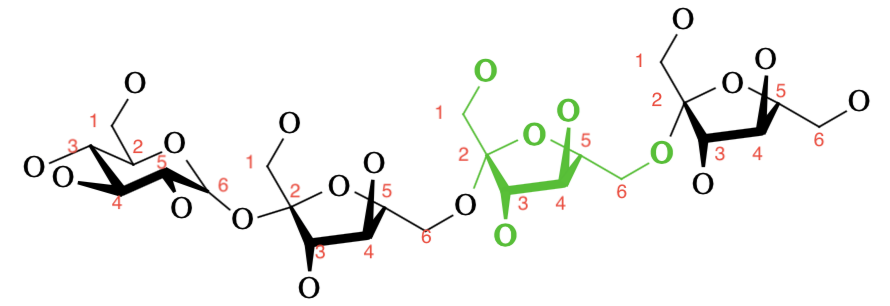
Levan in the linear form with β(2→6) glycosidic linkages.

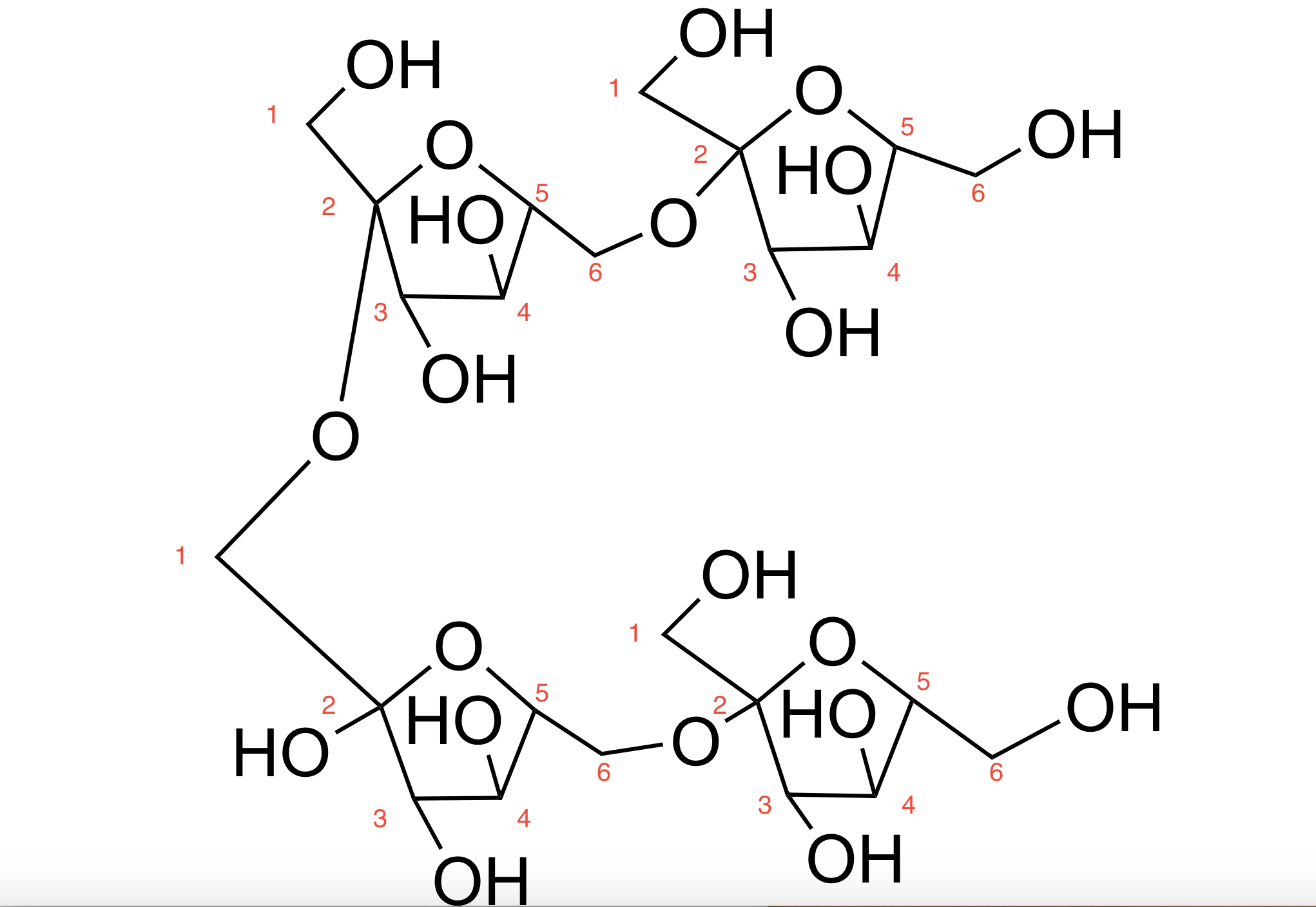
Levan in the branched from with β(2→6) glycosidic linkages.

Levan is a naturally occurring fructan present in many plants and microorganisms. This polymer is made up of fructose, a monosaccharide sugar, connected by β(2→6) glycosidic linkages. Levan can have both branched and linear structures of relatively low molecular weight. Branched levan forms a very small, sphere-like structure with basal chains 9 units long. The β(2→1) branching allows methyl ethers to form and create a spherical shape. The ends of levan also tend to contain a glucosyl residue. Branched levan tends to be more stable than linear polysaccharides. However, the amount of branching and length of polymerization tends to vary among different species. The shortest levan is 6-kestose, a chain of two fructose molecules and a terminal glucose molecule.

== Discovery ==
Levan was first discovered through research on nattō, a traditional Japanese dish. Natto was known as a "superfood" which promoted health and longevity in Japan during the late 1800s. In 1881, Edmund Oscar von Lippmann first discovered "lävulan" (levan) as the remaining gum from molasses in sugar beet production. Later in 1901, Greig-Smith coined the name "levan" based on the levorotatory properties of this substance in polarized light.

== Production ==
Levan is synthesized in archaea, fungi, bacteria, and a limited number of plant species. Fructans such as levan are synthesized from sucrose, a disaccharide containing glucose and fructose. In plants, the vacuole is where fructan production occurs. Sucrose:sucrose/fructan 6-fructosyltransferase is the fructosyltransferase in the vacuole which creates the β(2→6) linkages to form the linear form of levan. Bacteria also use a fructosyltransferase known as levansucrase to form levan. These enzymes in bacteria form the β(2→1) linkages in the linear basal chains of levan to allow for branching points to occur. Many bacteria produce levan in the cell exterior. This production can be sensitive to temperature, oxygen concentration, pH, and other factors. Levan production in bacteria is typically a sign of growth in population. There are also possible ways to produce by fracturing soybean mucilage.

Levans are produced by microbes during colonization of a food substrate. Erwinia amylovora exudes levan and amylovoran as part of its biofilm. Together they contribute to its pathogenicity. In 2016, Ua-Arak et al. developed a sourdough method with high levan output (among other exopolysaccharides).

== Properties ==
Levan is soluble in water and dimethyl sulfoxide; however, the water temperature varies the degree of solubility. It also is insoluble in many organic solvents such as methanol, ethanol, and isopropanol. Levan forms stable water emulsions with oils and kerosene, since it acts as an amphiphile due to its methylene groups. The β(2→6) linkages of levan allow for it to associate with the lipid bilayer. The branching of levan allows it to have a high tensile and cohesive strength, while the hydroxyl groups contribute to adhesion with other molecules. The intrinsic viscosity $\left[ \eta \right]$, a measure of the substance effect on viscosity of a solution, tends to be very low for levan. This allows levan to be utilized in a pharmaceutical setting.

== Real world implications ==
Many industries such as food, beverages, cosmetics, and even medicine utilize levan in their products. One of the reasons levan is able to be used in such a versatile way is that it fulfills all safety guidelines. Levan does not cause any form of skin or eye irritation, has not shown any allergenic effects, and poses no threat of cytotoxicity.

=== Food ===
In the food industry, levan is incorporated due to its prebiotic effects, cholesterol lowering ability, and adhesive properties. It also occurs naturally in low amounts in food for human consumption. Levan is also included in many dairy products as fiber or sweetener. Commercial, non-alcoholic beverages use levan as well in ultra-high-fructose-syrups. Levan causes bacterial growth and proliferation which can be especially important in the gut because it causes a decrease in population of the pathogenic bacteria.

=== Cosmetics ===
Levan can be used for hair care and skin whitening. In hair care products, levan acts to form a film which creates a hair holding effect utilized in various gels and mousses. Levan is used as a skin whitener as well because it has been tested to show inhibition on melanin production by decreasing the activity of the enzyme tyrosinase which is responsible for melanogenesis.

=== Medicine ===
Levan has shown uses for burned tissue, anti-inflammation, and aquaculture. By combining levan into a thin film, it is able to activate an enzyme known as metalloproteinase which increases the recovery and healing process. In the case of inflammation, levan interacts with the aggregating cells and affects their adhesion to the blood vessel causing reduced accumulation. In aquaculture, results have shown that levan incorporated diets could possibly cause an increase in aggregation of viruses allowing for easier phagocytic removal. Levan produced by Pantoea agglomerans ZMR7 was reported to decrease the viability of rhabdomyosarcoma (RD) and breast cancer (MDA) cells compared with untreated cancer cells. In addition, it has high antiparasitic activity against the promastigote of Leishmania tropica

== See also ==
- Food microbiology
- Industrial microbiology
