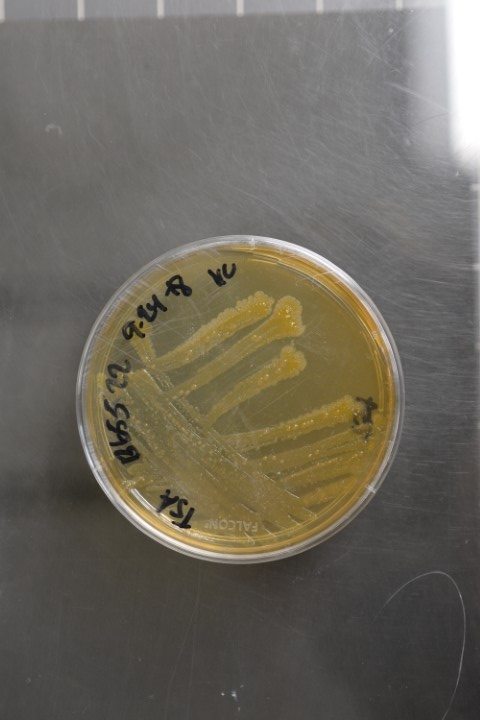
- Pantoea piersonii, formerly Kalamiella piersonii on agar plate

Scientific classification
- Domain: Bacteria
- Kingdom: Pseudomonadati
- Phylum: Pseudomonadota
- Class: Gammaproteobacteria
- Order: Enterobacterales
- Family: Erwiniaceae; Adeolu et al., 2016

Genera
- Buchnera; Erwinia; Mixta; Pantoea; Phaseolibacter; Tatumella; Wigglesworthia; Kalamiella

= Erwiniaceae =

Family of bacteria

The Erwiniaceae are a family of gram-negative bacteria which includes a number of plant pathogens and insect endosymbionts. This family is a member of the order Enterobacterales in the class Gammaproteobacteria of the phylum Pseudomonadota. The type genus of this family is Erwinia.

The name Erwiniaceae is derived from the Latin term Erwinia, referring the type genus of the family and the suffix "-aceae", an ending used to denote a family. Together, Erwiniaceae refers to a family whose nomenclatural type is the genus Erwinia.

== Biochemical characteristics and molecular signatures ==
These bacteria are catalase-positive, oxidase-negative, and do not produce indole or hydrogen disulfide. Most species are positive for Voges-Proskauer test, with the exception of Erwinia toletana, Erwinia ypographi and some strains of Erwinia oleae.

12 conserved signature indels (CSIs) were identified through genomic analyses as exclusive for this family in the proteins glutamate–cysteine ligase, DNA gyrase (subunit B), LPS assembly protein LptD, thiol:disulfide interchange protein DsbA precursor, two-component sensor histidine kinase, RNA helicase, tRNA pseudouridine(13) synthase TruD, glycine/betaine ABC transporter ATP-binding protein, superoxide dismutase, and stationary phase inducible protein CsiE. These CSIs provide a reliable molecular method of identification and differentiation of Erwiniaceae species from other families in the order Enterobacterales and other bacteria.

== Historical systematics and current taxonomy ==
Erwiniaceae, as of 2021, contains eight validly published genera. Members of this family were originally members of the family Enterobacteriaceae, a large phylogenetically unrelated group of species with distinct biochemical characteristics and different ecological niches. The original assignment of species into the family Enterobacteriaceae was largely based on 16S rRNA genome sequence analyses, which is known to have low discriminatory power and the results of which changes depends on the algorithm and organism information used. Despite this, the analyses still exhibited polyphyletic branching, indicating the presence of distinct subgroups within the family.

In 2016, Adeolu et al. proposed the division of Enterobacteriaceae into 7 novel families based on comparative genomic analyses and the branching pattern of various phylogenetic trees constructed from conserved genome sequences, 16S rRNA sequences and multilocus sequence analyses. Molecular markers, specifically conserved signature indels, specific to this family were also identified as evidence supporting the division independent of phylogenetic trees.
