= Trimeric autotransporter adhesin =

Proteins found on the outer membrane of Gram-negative bacteria

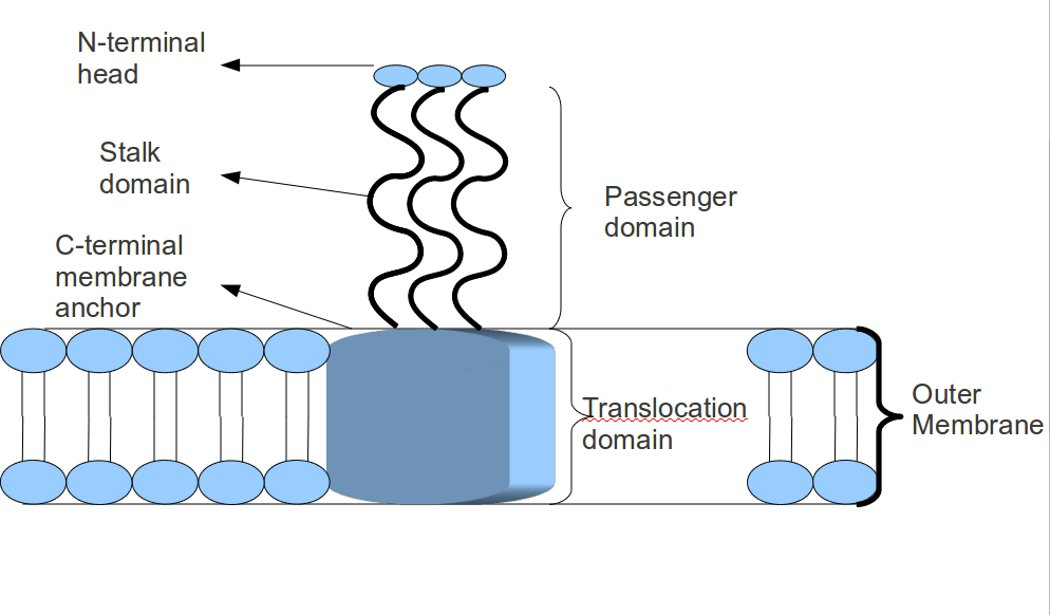
Figure 1 Schematic diagram of the basic Trimeric Autotransporter Adhesin structure

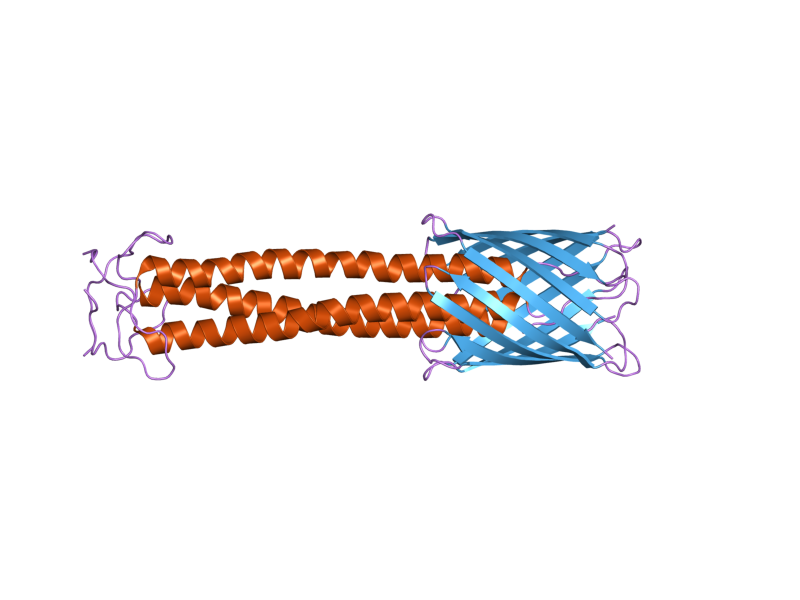
Figure 2 The C-terminal membrane anchor domain can clearly be seen on the right in blue. The stalk domain can be seen in red.

In molecular biology, trimeric autotransporter adhesins (TAAs), are proteins found on the outer membrane of Gram-negative bacteria. Bacteria use TAAs in order to infect their host cells via a process called cell adhesion. TAAs also go by another name, oligomeric coiled-coil adhesins, which is shortened to OCAs. In essence, they are virulence factors, factors that make the bacteria harmful and infective to the host organism.

TAAs are just one of many methods bacteria use to infect their hosts, infection resulting in diseases such as pneumonia, sepsis, and meningitis. Most bacteria infect their host through a method named the secretion pathway. TAAs are part of the secretion pathway, to be more specific the type Vc secretion system.

Trimeric autotransporter adhesins have a unique structure. The structure they hold is crucial to their function. They all appear to have a head-stalk-anchor structure. Each TAA is made up of three identical proteins, hence the name trimeric. Once the membrane anchor has been inserted into the outer membrane, the passenger domain passes through it into the host extracellular environment autonomously, hence the description of autotransporter. The head domain, once assembled, then adheres to an element of the host extracellular matrix, for example, collagen, fibronectin, etc.

== Molecular structure ==
Most TAAs have a similar protein structure. When observed with electron microscopy, the structure has been described as a "lollipop" shape consisting of an N-terminal head domain, a stalk domain, and a C-terminal membrane anchor domain. Often, the literature refers to these as Passenger domain, containing the N-terminal, head, neck, and coiled-coil stalk, and the Translocation domain, referring to the C-terminal membrane anchor. Although all TAAs carry a membrane anchor in common, they may not all contain both a stalk and a head as well. In addition, all membrane anchor domains are of the left-handed parallel beta-roll type.

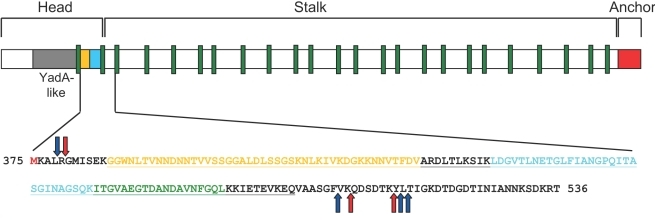
Figure 3 The protein domain arrangement of the Trimeric Autotransporter Adhesin, BadA This figure shows the head, stalk and anchor domains. It shows the YadA-like head in grey. The stalk contains repeats coloured in green and the membrane anchor in red. The sequence below shows colouring according to domain arrangement and protease cleavage sites red (trypsin) and blue (chymotrypsin). (Figure used from open access journal, in the public domain, Public Library of Science (PLoS) Pathogen

== Extended Signal Peptide Region domain ==
ESPR

Identifiers
- Symbol: ESPR
- Pfam: PF13018
Available protein structures:
- PDB: PF13018 (ECOD; PDBsum)
- AlphaFold: PF13018

The Extended Signal Peptide Region (ESPR) is found in the N-terminus of the signal peptides of proteins belonging to the Type V secretion systems. The function of the ESPR is to aid inner membrane translocation by acting as a temporary tether. This prevents the accumulation of misfolded proteins. The ESPR can be divided into individual regions, they are as follows: N1 (charged), H1 (hydrophobic), N2, H2 and C (cleavage site) domains. N1 and H1 form the ESPR and have strong conservation.

Function: There are several roles that the Extended Signal Peptide Region is thought to hold. First, biogenesis of proteins in the Type V Secretion System (T5SS). Second, it is thought to target the protein to the inner membrane to be translocated either by the signal recognition particle pathway (SRP) or by twin arginine translocated (TAT). Third, it has been observed and believed to regulate the rate of protein migration into the periplasm.

== N-terminal head domain ==
Structure: This particular domain is a trimer of single-stranded, left-handed beta-helices. These associate to form a nine-coiled left-handed beta-roll. It contains sequence motifs, of which there is a strong similarity with other TAA heads. This indicates that there is a lot of similarity when comparing protein structure. The head domain is connected to the stalk by a short, highly conserved sequence, which is often called the neck, or occasionally named the connector.

Function: The function of this protein domain is to bind to the extracellular matrix of the host, most notably fibronectin, collagen, and laminin. The head domain is very important for attachment to the host cell and for autoagglutination, sticking to itself.

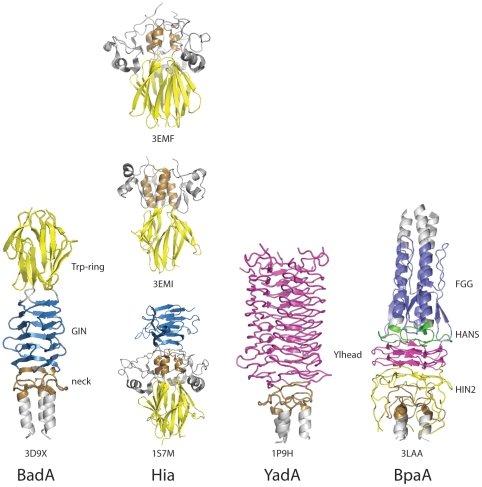
Figure 4 Comparison of Head domains in different Trimeric Autotransporter Adhesins (Figure used from open access journal, in the public domain, Public Library of Science (PLoS) Pathogen)

There are several types of head domain. Each domain helps the head to bind to a different component of the extracellular matrix. These are as follows: YadA-like head domain, Trp-ring, GIN, FxG, HIN1, and HIN2. This entry focuses on the first three mentioned.

=== YadA-like head ===
YadA-like head is composed of single-stranded, left-handed beta-helices, which associate further to create a nine-coiled left-handed parallel beta-roll (LPBR). It is the tightest beta-roll structure known, and the first to be discovered. The YadA head domain has eight repeat motifs, each fourteen residues in length.

=== Trp ring ===
The Trp ring is the second-most-common TAA head. Trp is an amino acid named tryptophan. The Trp ring obtains its name from the high levels of tryptophan found in the C-terminal part of the Head domain. These work by stabilising the transition between the coiled-coil and the beta-meander where the head meets the neck or stalk. In many cases, the Trp ring is often followed by the GIN domain.

=== GIN ===
The GIN domain is a head domain named after its sequence motif GIN (Glycine-Isoleucine-Asparagine) motif. It has an all-beta structure, whereby the two pairs of antiparallel beta sheets are connected by a diagonally running extended beta-sheet. The sheets then further fold to form a beta prism in which each wall is composed of a complete set of five beta-strands. The GIN domain is often followed by a neck domain.

== Neck domain ==
Structure: The neck domain is a homotrimer, where three of the same subunits associate. All three subunits are arranged in such a way that they resemble a "safety pin"-like structure.

Function: The function of the neck domain is to be the adaptor between the larger diameter of the beta-helices and the smaller one of the coiled coil. Furthermore, just like its safety pin structure, it also has a function of pinning all three monomers together and pins it to the head domain. This increases the stability of the neck domain.

There are seven different type of neck domains. They are as follows: ISneck1, ISneck2, HANS connector, DALL-1, DALL-2, DALL-3, and the neck domain. This entry focuses on the ISneck domain.

=== ISneck domain ===
The ISneck domain is a type of neck domain. There are two types of ISneck domain. This first is an ISneck which is interrupted by an insertion. The insertion can take form of either folded (ISneck 1) or much shorter, unfolded (ISneck 2) perturbation.

== Stalk domain ==
YadA_stalk

Identifiers
- Symbol: YadA_stalk
- Pfam: PF05662
- InterPro: IPR008635
- SCOP2: 1s7m / SCOPe / SUPFAM
Available protein structures:
- PDB: IPR008635 PF05662 (ECOD; PDBsum)
- AlphaFold: IPR008635; PF05662

Structure: These domains are fibrous and found in highly repetitive numbers. They contain coiled coils and their length tends to vary among different species. The coiled-coil segments of the stalk domains have two unusual properties:

1. they alternate from right-handed to left-handed supercoiling
2. often interrupted by small globular domains, which owes to their appearance of segmented ropes.

Furthermore, the stalk is made up entirely of pentadecads. Hence, the stalk domains can be considered alpha helical coiled-coils that deviate from the standard model due to their unusual properties. From a deeper structural perspective, coiled-coil arranges itself in such a way that the crossing angle between the helices is almost zero. The packing of these helices follows a "knobs-into-holes" arrangement whereby hydrophobic residues protrude forming knobs that pack into cavities formed by other residues on another helix. Then, once the knobs are packed into cavities, the three helices are wound in register around each other, so all of the residues in certain positions are at the same height.

Function: Their role is to act as spacers by moving the head domains away from the bacterial cell surface and toward the extracellular matrix of the host. They also have a role in protecting the bacterial cell against host defences. They do this by aiding complement resistance. The stalk protein domain is also alternatively named the internal passenger domain.

There are two types of stalk domain: the FGG domain and the right-handed stalk domain.

== C-terminal membrane anchor domain ==
YadA bacterial adhesin anchor domain
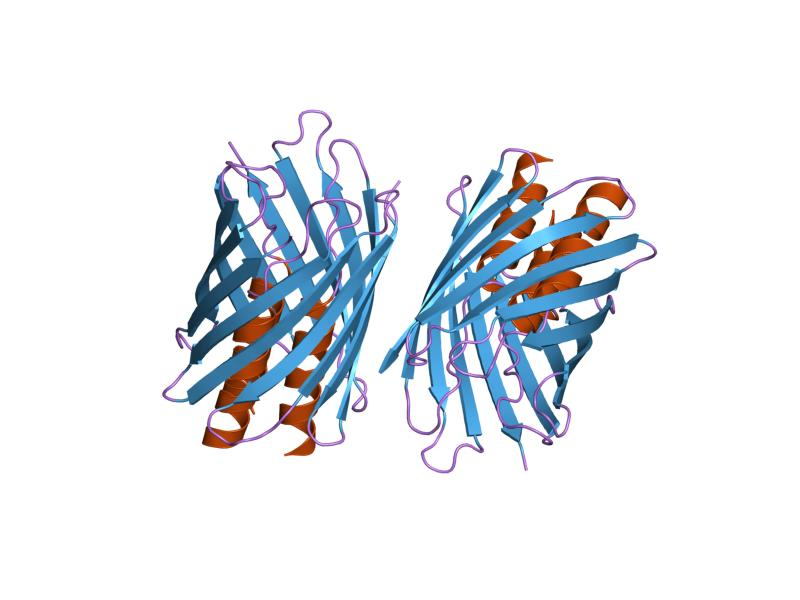
- The beta barrel structure found in the C-terminus of the bacterial adhesin anchor domain, YadA

Identifiers
- Symbol: YadA_anchor
- Pfam: PF03895
- Pfam clan: CL0327
- InterPro: IPR005594
Available protein structures:
- PDB: IPR005594 PF03895 (ECOD; PDBsum)
- AlphaFold: IPR005594; PF03895

Structure: The structure of this protein domain is a left-handed coiled-coil followed by four transmembrane beta strands. It is thought that, once trimerisation has occurred, these beta strands further fold into a 12-stranded beta-barrel. It also contains a recognition site for signal peptidases, which means the enzyme will recognise the signal peptide and cleave it at a particular point.

Function: The function of the membrane anchor domain is to aid the movement of the polypeptide chain through the cell membrane, a process known as autotransport activity. The way TAAs translocate across the outer membrane remains to be elucidated, but it is thought that it translocates inside the beta-barrel, leading to transportation of the passenger domain from the C terminus to the N terminus through the beta-barrel lumen. In essence, the beta-barrel is a porin that sits within the bacterial outer membrane. The passenger domain or in other words coiled-coil stalk domain translocates through this pore. Additional functions of the membrane anchor is to oligomerise the stalk domain and to anchor the whole protein to the bacterial outer membrane.

== Model proteins ==
All Trimeric Autotransporter Adhesins are crucial virulence factors that cause serious disease in humans. The most-studied and well-known Trimeric Autotransporter Adhesins are listed below:

- YadA of Yersinia enterocolitica
- NadA of Neisseria meningitidis
- UspA1 and A2 of Moraxella catarrhalis
- Hia and Hsf of Haemophilus influenzae
- BadA of Bartonella henselae

Domain	Proteins					
Domain	YadA	NadA	UspA1	HadA	Hia	BadA
N terminal Head	Single-stranded, left-handed beta helix	Globular head	Beta propeller head	Not present	Beta prisms	Similar to YadA head, contains left handed beta helix
Neck	Present	Not present	Present	Present	Present	Present
Stalk	Right-handed coiled-coil	Coiled-coil alpha helices followed by a linker region	Extended coiled-coil	Three-alpha helix coiled-coil	Three-alpha helix coiled-coil	Extended coiled-coil
C terminal Membrane anchor	Beta barrel structure	Beta barrel structure	Beta barrel structure	Beta barrel structure	Beta barrel structure	Beta barrel structure

YadA head domain
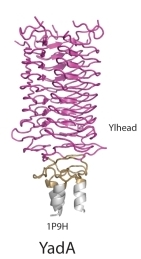
- Crystal structure of the collagen-binding domain of Yersinia adhesin YadA

Identifiers
- Symbol: YadA_head
- Pfam: PF05658
- InterPro: IPR008640
- SCOP2: 1p9h / SCOPe / SUPFAM
Available protein structures:
- PDB: IPR008640 PF05658 (ECOD; PDBsum)
- AlphaFold: IPR008640; PF05658

=== YadA protein ===
YadA is a protein domain found in Gram-negative bacteria such as Yersinia enterocolitica, Yersinia pestis, and Yersinia pseudotuberculosis. YadA stands for Yersinia adhesin protein A. This protein domain is an example of Trimeric Autotransporter Adhesins, and it was the first TAA to be discovered. Like other TAAs, YadA also undergoes homotrimerisation to form a stable collagen-binding protein. Homotrimerisation is a process whereby three of the same subunits, associate to make a complex of three identical YadA proteins. Furthermore, just like other TAAs, it has a head-stalk-anchor protein architecture. The majority of TAAs share strong similarity in the C-terminal membrane anchor region, the only member to differ across TAAs is the head, neck, and stalk regions. The head region of YadA is composed of beta-helices further folded to create a nine-coiled left-handed parallel beta-roll (LPBR).

=== NadA protein ===
Another example of a TAA is the NadA protein. The NadA protein is found in a species of Gram-negative bacteria called Neisseria meningitidis, which causes sepsis and meningitis in humans. Studies have shown that the globular N-terminal head domain of NadA is vital for adhesion. NadA also contains a coiled-coil region and also a C-terminal membrane anchor.

=== UspA1 protein ===
UspA1 is another example of a Trimeric Autotransporter Adhesin found in the bacterium Moraxella catarrhalis, found as a common cause of middle ear infections in humans. The structure of UspA1 also has a head domain at N-terminal domain, however it is folded into the beta propeller. Like the other TAAs, it has a coiled-coil stalk region but, in this case it is extended, and it has the TAA typical C-terminal beta barrel membrane anchor domain.

=== Hia protein ===
The Hia protein is a TAA found on the outer membrane of the bacterium Haemophilus influenzae. It adheres to the respiratory epithelium in humans. This protein can cause pneumonia and some strains cause meningitis and sepsis. Hia has a slightly unusual N-terminal head made of beta-prisms. The beta-prism is an unusual type of protein architecture first described by Chothia and Murzin. As the name suggests, it holds three beta sheets arranged in a triangular prism and contains internal symmetry. Additionally, the head domain contains 5 Trp-Ring domains. Furthermore, this protein also contains three neck domains, of which two are IsNeck domains in addition to other domains such as KG, GANG, and TTT domains. It also contains a coiled-coil stalk and the typically conserved TAA C terminal membrane anchor.

=== BadA protein ===
The BadA protein is another example of a TAA found in Bartonella henselae bacteria. Bartonella henselae is the causative agent of cat scratch disease, a normally harmless disease, but, in people with a weakened immune system, such as those undergoing chemotherapy or fighting AIDS, it is more serious as it can lead to bacillary angiomatosis. This a condition where benign tumours of the blood vessels undergo uncontrolled proliferation, causing knots to form in the smaller blood vessels, such as capillaries, restricting the flow of blood. This may be due to BadA's inducing the transcription of proangiogenic factors, as it activates of NF-κB as well as hypoxia-inducible factor 1. The head domain of BadA is more complex than other TAAs. It is thought to be a chimera or, in other words, a combination of YadA and Hia head domains. This combination gives insight into how the pathogenicity of Gram-negative bacteria has evolved over time. BadA also contains a neck domain, an extended coil-coil stalk, and beta-barrel C terminal membrane anchor.

== Clinical effects ==
Clinical effect of infection with virulence factor
Protein Domain	Bacterial species	Diseases caused
YadA	Yersinia enterocolitica	yersiniosis
NadA	Neisseria meningitidis	sepsis and meningitis
UspA1	Moraxella catarrhalis	middle ear infection
Hia	Haemophilus influenzae	pneumonia and some strains cause meningitis and sepsis
BadA	Bartonella henselae	cat-scratch disease

== Infection process ==
The process of infection is complicated. The invasive bacterium must overcome many barriers in order to infect its host, including environmental barriers, physical barriers and immune system barriers. The bacterium must enter the host's body and, in the case of Yersinia sp., invade the host intestinal mucosa. Then the Trimeric Autotransporter Adhesin must adhere to the layer of cells found on the internal surface, the epithelial cells, in the intestine by using its head to bind to proteins found in the extracellular matrix such as collagen, laminin, and fibronectin. It is important that these outer-membrane adhesins make physical contact with the receptors found on the host cell. This means that the adhesin must be long enough to extend beyond the lipopolysaccharide layer in the outer membrane of the bacterium and interact with the glycan layer of the host cell. Once it has done so, it may bind to the ECM of the host cell. TAAs are a type of microbial surface components recognizing adhesive matrix molecules (MSCRAMMs). In other words, they are a complex that aids adhesion to the ECM.

== Type V secretion system (T5SS) ==
Figure 5 A schematic diagram illustrating the Trimeric Autotransporter Adhesins in Type V Secretion System.

Secretion is one method of transferring substances across the bacterial outer membrane. Gram-negative bacteria have very different cell wall structures in comparison to Gram-positive bacteria. Gram-negative bacteria have three layers: The innermost layer is named the inner membrane; the middle layer, named the periplasmic space, is a space containing a thin layer of peptidoglycan; and the third layer is named the outer membrane, which contains lipopolysaccharides.

In Gram-negative bacteria, the secretary pathway is very different from that of eukaryotes or Gram-positive bacteria, mainly due to the difference in cell wall structure. Trimeric Autotransporter Adhesins use a particular secretion pathway, named type V secretion system (T5SS). Gram-negative bacteria must secrete adhesins, since they have an outer membrane that makes it hard for them to stick to and infect the host. The outer membrane is useful, as it allows the bacteria to colonize, and adds another layer of protection. However, the outer membrane is a barrier for the secretion of proteins, and it requires energy to transport proteins across the outer membrane. Hence, the T5SS pathway overcomes this problem.

T5SS uses Sec-machinery system to work. The enzyme Sec translocase is found to be present on the inner membrane. Such Sec-dependent systems do not need to use energy, unlike Sec-independent machinery, which uses other forms of energy such as adenosine triphosphate (ATP) or a proton gradient. Since it can transport things across the outer membrane without the need to generate a new form of energy, it earned the name autotransporter, since it transports proteins autonomously, in other words, by itself.

The Sec-dependent system is divided into three pathways. TAAs are one of those pathways and also go by the name type Vc secretion pathway. The mechanism is split into two. First, the protein must move across the inner membrane or, in other words, translocate, in a Sec-dependent manner via the periplasm. The signal peptide on the N-terminus acts as a temporary tether to hold it in place. Next, it must move to the outer membrane. The trimerisation aids translocation, and no translocation would occur without its beta-barrel membrane anchor. The type V secretion system is described as non-fimbrious, meaning that the bacterial cells do not use long physical appendages named pili to attach to one another.

== Evading the host's immune system ==
The TAAs can help prevent the bacteria from being destroyed by the host's immune system. In particular in the case of certain Yersinia spp., the TAA YadA has a role in autoagglutination, serum resistance, complement inactivation, and phagocytosis resistance. All of these methods prevent the bacteria from being eliminated by the host and ensure its survival.
