= Yersinia wautersii =

Scientific classification
- Domain: Bacteria
- Kingdom: Pseudomonadati
- Phylum: Pseudomonadota
- Class: Gammaproteobacteria
- Order: Enterobacterales
- Family: Yersiniaceae
- Genus: Yersinia
- Species: Y. wautersii

Binomial name
- Yersinia wautersii Savin et al., 2014

Species of bacterium

Yersinia wautersii is a species of Gram-negative bacteria that was originally called the Korean Group of the Yersinia pseudotuberculosis complex. The type strain is 12-219N1 (=CIP 110607 =DSM 27350).

== Etymology ==
Yersinia wautersii, wau.ter.si’i N.L. gen. masc. n. wautersii, named in honor of Professor George Wauters, a Belgian microbiologist who contributed an in depth characterization of the genus Yersinia, including the biotyping scheme of Yersinia enterocolitica.
