= List of diseases (Y) =

This is a list of diseases starting with the letter "Y".

== Y ==
- Y chromosome deletions
- Yaws
- Yeast infection
- Yellow fever
- Yellow nail syndrome
- Yemenite deaf-blind hypopigmentation syndrome
- Yersinia pestis infection
- Yersiniosis
  - Yersinia entercolitica infection
  - Yersinia pseudotuberculosis infection
- Yim–Ebbin syndrome
- Yolk sac tumor
- Yorifuji–Okuno syndrome
- Yoshimura–Takeshita syndrome
- Young–Hughes syndrome
- Young–Madders syndrome
- Young McKeever Squier syndrome
- Young Simpson syndrome
- Young syndrome
- Yunis–Varon syndrome
- Yusho disease
