= Yersinia bercovieri =

Scientific classification
- Domain: Bacteria
- Kingdom: Pseudomonadati
- Phylum: Pseudomonadota
- Class: Gammaproteobacteria
- Order: Enterobacterales
- Family: Yersiniaceae
- Genus: Yersinia
- Species: Y. bercovieri

Binomial name
- Yersinia bercovieri Wauters et al. 1988

Species of bacterium

Yersinia bercovieri is a Gram-negative species of enteric bacteria.

== Etymology ==
Yersinia bercovieri, N.L. gen. masc. n. bercovieri, of Bercovier, named in honor of Hervé Bercovier, who first described biogroups 3A and 3B for Yersinia enterocolitica. These biogroups are now known as Yersinia mollaretii and Yersinia bercovieri respectively.
