= Yersinia canariae =

Scientific classification
- Domain: Bacteria
- Kingdom: Pseudomonadati
- Phylum: Pseudomonadota
- Class: Gammaproteobacteria
- Order: Enterobacterales
- Family: Yersiniaceae
- Genus: Yersinia
- Species: Y. canariae

Binomial name
- Yersinia canariae Nguyen et al. 2020

Species of bacterium

Yersinia canariae is a Gram-negative species of Yersinia that was isolated from a human displaying symptoms of yersiniosis. Biochemically, it is similar to Yersinia enterocolitica but whole-genome sequencing data determined it is a distinct species.
