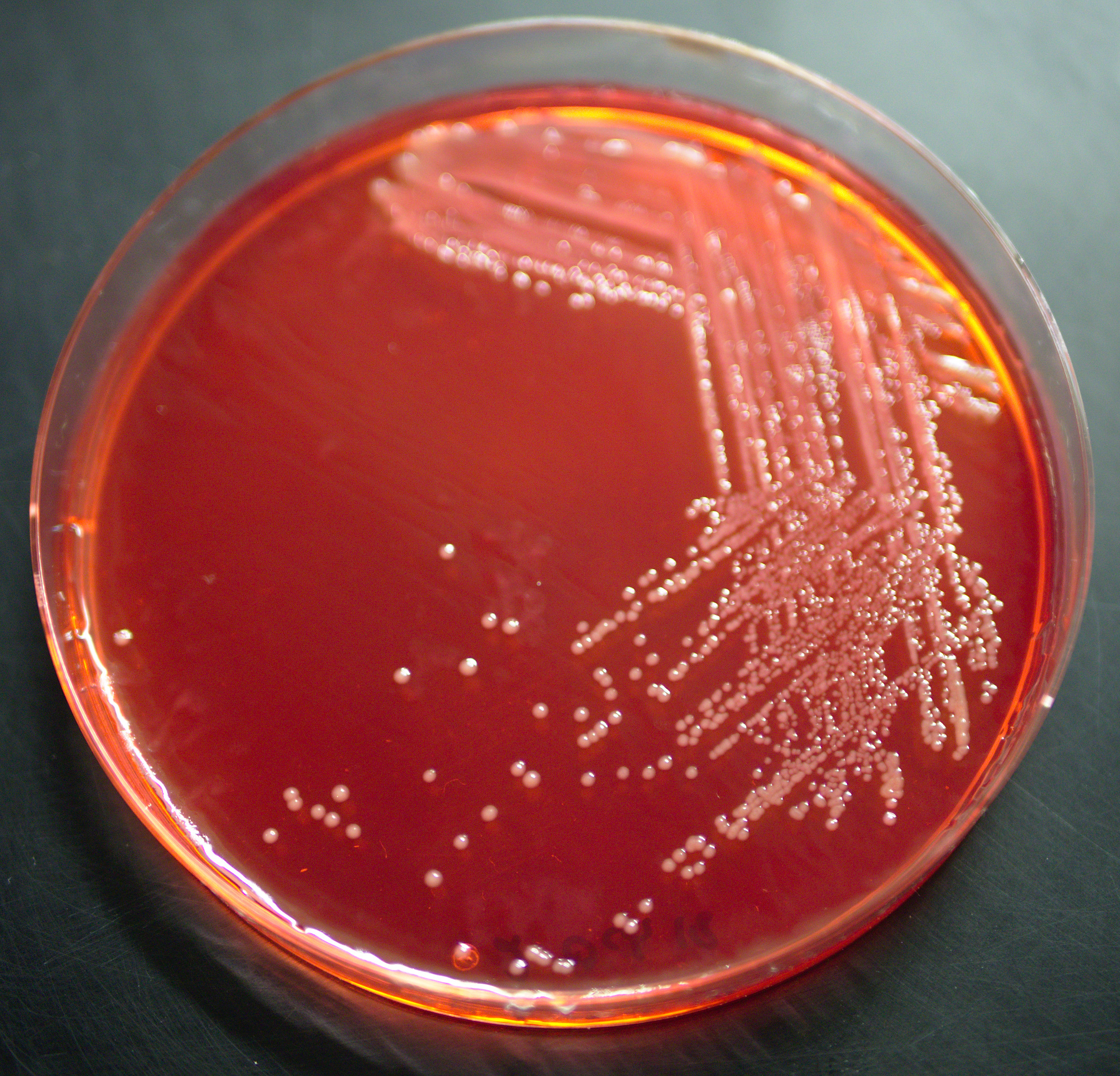
- Y. hibernica on XLD agar

Scientific classification
- Domain: Bacteria
- Kingdom: Pseudomonadati
- Phylum: Pseudomonadota
- Class: Gammaproteobacteria
- Order: Enterobacterales
- Family: Yersiniaceae
- Genus: Yersinia
- Species: Y. hibernica

Binomial name
- Yersinia hibernica Nguyen et al., 2019

= Yersinia hibernica =

Species of bacterium

Yersinia hibernica is a species of Yersinia that was originally isolated in a pig-production environment. The type strain is CFS1934 (= NCTC 14222 = LMG 31076). This species has previously been misidentified as Yersinia enterocolitica and Yersinia kristensenii but it may be distinguished biochemically by lack of sucrose utilization. In addition to pig related environments, Y. hibernica has also been isolated from the feces of Rattus norvegicus and Hydrochoerus hydrochaeris.

== Etymology ==
Hibernica, from Hibernia, pertaining to Ireland from where the type strain was isolated.
