= Yersinia proxima =

Scientific classification
- Domain: Bacteria
- Kingdom: Pseudomonadati
- Phylum: Pseudomonadota
- Class: Gammaproteobacteria
- Order: Enterobacterales
- Family: Yersiniaceae
- Genus: Yersinia
- Species: Y. proxima

Binomial name
- Yersinia proxima Le Guern et al. 2020

Species of bacterium

Yersinia proxima is a Gram-negative bacterium in the family Yersiniaceae that is phylogenetically close to Yersinia enterocolitica. Members of this species have been found in human feces.
