= Yersinia thracica =

Scientific classification
- Domain: Bacteria
- Kingdom: Pseudomonadati
- Phylum: Pseudomonadota
- Class: Gammaproteobacteria
- Order: Enterobacterales
- Family: Yersiniaceae
- Genus: Yersinia
- Species: Y. thracica

Binomial name
- Yersinia thracica Le Guern et al. 2020

Species of bacterium

Yersinia thracica is a Gram-negative species of enteric bacteria in the Yersinia genus that is closely related to Yersinia kristensenii. Reportedly, it has only been isolated in animals. The type strain, IP34646^{T}, was isolated from diseased rainbow trout while other isolates are from birds, pig feces, and wild boars.
