= Yersinia rochesterensis =

Scientific classification
- Domain: Bacteria
- Kingdom: Pseudomonadati
- Phylum: Pseudomonadota
- Class: Gammaproteobacteria
- Order: Enterobacterales
- Family: Yersiniaceae
- Genus: Yersinia
- Species: Y. rochesterensis

Binomial name
- Yersinia rochesterensis (Cunningham et al. 2019) Nguyen et al. 2021

Species of bacterium

Yersinia rochesterensis is a Gram-negative, motile, rod-shaped bacterium that forms circular colonies and was isolated from human feces. This potentially pathogenic species has been isolated in human stools in France and in the United States where it was characterized at the Mayo Clinic. A Y. rochesterensis strain, isolated from hare and initially identified as Yersinia kristensenii, was serotyped as O:12,25.
