= Yersinia similis =

Scientific classification
- Domain: Bacteria
- Kingdom: Pseudomonadati
- Phylum: Pseudomonadota
- Class: Gammaproteobacteria
- Order: Enterobacterales
- Family: Yersiniaceae
- Genus: Yersinia
- Species: Y. similis

Binomial name
- Yersinia similis Sprague et al., 2008

Gram-negative bacteria

Yersinia similis is a Gram-negative bacteria species of Yersinia that resembles Yersinia pseudotuberculosis phenotypically but differs on the basis of 16S ribosomal RNA sequences. The type strain Y228 (=CCUG 52882 =DSM 18211 =LMG 23763) was originally isolated from a rabbit in Germany.

== Etymology ==
Yersinia similis, L. fem. adj. similis, similar, resembling, as the strains are similar to those of Yersinia pseudotuberculosis.
