= Yersinia aldovae =

Scientific classification
- Domain: Bacteria
- Kingdom: Pseudomonadati
- Phylum: Pseudomonadota
- Class: Gammaproteobacteria
- Order: Enterobacterales
- Family: Yersiniaceae
- Genus: Yersinia
- Species: Y. aldovae

Binomial name
- Yersinia aldovae Bercovier et al., 1984

Species of bacterium

Yersinia aldovae is a species of bacteria that was originally described as Group X2 Yersinia enterocolitica. Its type strain is CNY 6005 (= CDC 669-83 = ATCC 35236). Y. aldovae has been isolated from aquatic environments and soil, but it has not been associated with animal or human illnesses.

== Etymology ==
N.L. gen. fem. n. aldovae, of Aldova, named in honor of Eva Aldová, the Czechoslovak microbiologist who first isolated the bacterium.
