= YadA bacterial adhesin protein domain =

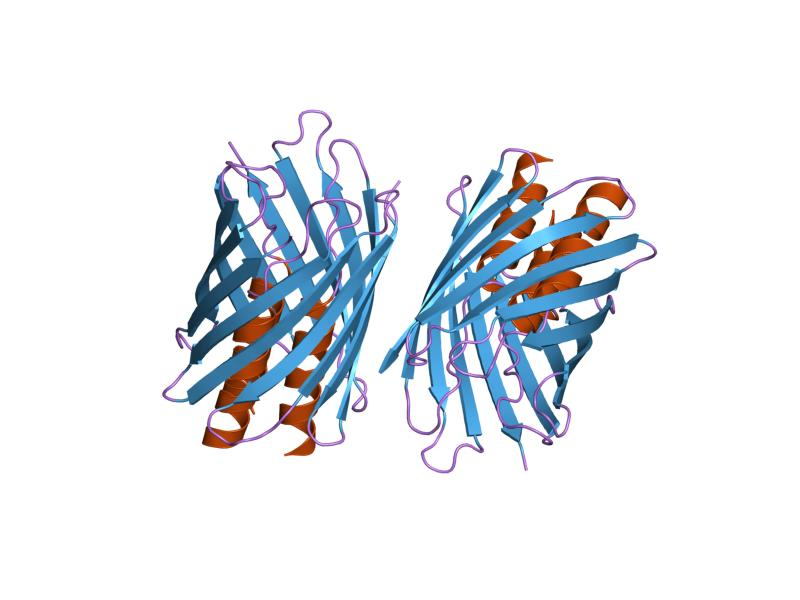
- The beta barrel structure found in the C-terminus of the bacterial adhesin protein domain, YadA

Identifiers
- Symbol: YadA
- Pfam: PF03895
- Pfam clan: CL0327
- InterPro: IPR005594
Available protein structures:
- PDB: IPR005594 PF03895 (ECOD; PDBsum)
- AlphaFold: IPR005594; PF03895

In molecular biology, YadA is a protein domain which is short for Yersinia adhesin A. These proteins have strong sequence and structural homology, particularly at their C-terminal end. The function is to promote their pathogenicity and virulence in host cells, though cell adhesion. YadA is found in three pathogenic species of Yersinia, Y. pestis, Y. pseudotuberculosis, and Y. enterocolitica. The YadA domain is encoded for by a virulence plasmid in Yersinia, which encodes a type-III secretion (T3S) system consisting of the Ysc injectisome and the Yop effectors.

== Function ==
Essentially, the main function of the YadA domain is to help cell adhesion and to increase virulence. YadA is a collagen-binding outer membrane protein. It forms the fibrillar matrix on the bacterial cell surface. This aids cell attachment and helps the bacteria invade eukaryotic cells. Additionally, by forming the fibrillar matrix, the YadA domain protects the bacteria by facilitating agglutination resistance, serum resistance, complement inactivation and phagocytosis resistance.

The importance of adhesins to YadA function and Yersinia survival is huge. Attachment further allows more interactions and increase of biofilm formation to aid bacterial colonization. In Yersinia, it helps initiate the infectious process in host cells and are critical virulence factors. Additionally, bacteria have the ability to regulate adhesion expression, meaning that when Yersinia no longer requires YadA, it can be turned off. Furthermore, YadA expression is mainly temperature regulated, at 37 degrees Celsius. It also has two molecular regulators: an activator, VirF and a repressor, YmoA.

== Substrate adhesion ==
The YadA protein domain adheres to the following substrates:

- epithelial cells
- extracellular matrix
- collagen
- cellular fibronectin
- laminin

== Protein domains in YadA ==
=== C terminal domain ===
The C-terminal domain consists of 120 amino acids which belong to a family of surface-exposed bacterial proteins. The YadA C-terminal domain has a particular function in translocating the trimeric N-terminal passenger domain to the exterior of the membrane and is also responsible for trimerisation.

== Structure ==
=== C-terminal domain structure ===
The C-terminal region is a transmembrane region which consists of 4 beta strands which form trimers in the outer membrane. The C-terminal contains 9 amino acids which alternate hydrophobic amino acids ending in F (Phenylalanine) or W (Tryptophan), this composes a targeting motif for the outer membrane of the Gram-negative cell membrane. This region is important for oligomerisation. The C-terminal domain helps to build the beta barrel pore in the outer membrane.

=== YadA protein structure ===
YadA is a homotrimeric outer membrane protein which forms part of the fibrillar matrix. Simplistically, this means the protein is made of three of the same subunits, on the outer surface of the membrane. The surface is entirely covered in the YadA lollipop structures. made of a short C-terminal membrane anchor, an 18 nm long coiled-coil stem and a 5 nm long N-terminal globular head structure consisting of a left-handed parallel beta roll. YadA is an example of an oligomeric coiled-coil adhesion (Oca). The Oca protein families are a subset of autotransporters, also known as the type Vc or trimeric autotransporters.

Trimerization is thought to involve the coiled-coil stem and the C-terminal membrane anchor, which forms a 12-strand beta-barrelfrom the four transmembrane beta-strands of the three monomers. This beta-barrel would form a pore-like structure through which the N-terminal head and coiled helical domains of the three monomer chains exit to the cell surface. The YadA protein domain, is a form of trimeric autotransporter adhesins (TAAs). Each TAA must consist of a head, stalk and a beta-barrel membrane anchor.

== History ==
YadA, an adhesin from Yersinia, was the first member of this family to be characterised. UspA2 from Moraxella was second. The Eib immunoglobulin-binding proteins from Escherichia coli were third, followed by the DsrA proteins of Haemophilus ducreyi, amongst others.

== See also ==
Trimeric Autotransporter Adhesins (TAA)
