= Yersinia artesiana =

Scientific classification
- Domain: Bacteria
- Kingdom: Pseudomonadati
- Phylum: Pseudomonadota
- Class: Gammaproteobacteria
- Order: Enterobacterales
- Family: Yersiniaceae
- Genus: Yersinia
- Species: Y. artesiana

Binomial name
- Yersinia artesiana Le Guern et al. 2020

Species of bacterium

Yersinia artesiana are short Gram-negative rod bacteria in the Yersiniaceae family that have been isolated from human stool.
