= Far East scarlet-like fever =

- Other names: Scarlatinoid fever
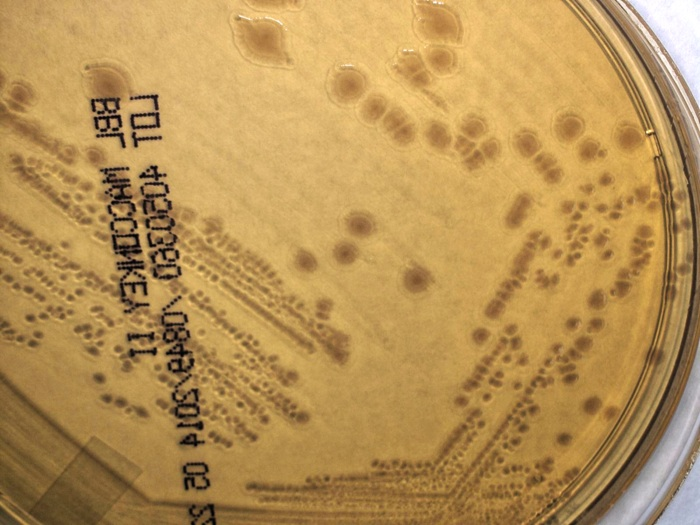
- Yersinia pseudotuberculosis colonies on MacConkey agar, negative result for lactose fermentation.
- Specialty: Infectious disease

Far East scarlet-like fever is an infectious disease caused by the gram negative bacillus Yersinia pseudotuberculosis. In Japan it is called Izumi fever.

It is specifically caused by strains that carry YPM, a superantigen that causes uncontrolled activation of some T cells, most commonly found in East Asia. Its symptoms are a combination of the gastrointestinal symptoms typical of yersiniosis and its unique immunologic disruptions.

== Signs and symptoms ==
These include

- red skin rash usually of the face, elbows, and knees
- skin desquamation
- exanthema
- red tongue
- toxic shock syndrome

Other features include mesenteric lymphadenitis and arthritis. Kidney failure rarely occurs. Relapses occur in up to 50% of patients. Enterocolitis is common in children. Sepsis occasionally occurs; it primarily occurs in patients with preexisting comorbidities such as diabetes mellitus, liver cirrhosis, or hemochromatosis. Postinfective complications include reactive arthritis, erythema nodosum, iritis, and glomerulonephritis.

== Cause ==
The cause of this disease is Yersinia pseudotuberculosis serotype O1. 95% are subtype O1b.

Yersinia pseudotuberculosis has been divided into 6 genetic groups: group 1 has only been isolated from the Far East.

== Pathophysiology ==
The clinical features of this disease appear to be due—at least in part—to the production of a superantigen—YpM (Yersinia pseudotuberculosis-derived mitogen). This is present in almost all strains from the Far East but only 20% of European isolates. The antigen was discovered in 1993 and is encoded by a 456-base gene. The protein has 151 amino acids, with a signal sequence of 20 amino acids. The mitogenic antigens are scattered across the protein but two cysteine residues (residues 32 and 129) which form a disulfide bridge are critical.

The G+C content of this gene is 35%—lower than the genomic average (47%) suggesting that this gene has been acquired from some other organism. The organism from which this gene originated has not yet been identified. This gene seems likely to have been introduced into the genome by a bacteriophage, given the nearby presence of a phage integration site, but the mechanism of entry into the genome is not currently known.

== Diagnosis ==
=== Differential diagnosis ===
The main differential diagnosis is scarlet fever.

== History ==
The first outbreak of this disease was reported from the Pacific coastal areas (Primorsky Krai) of Russia in the 1950s.
