= Yersinia nurmii =

Scientific classification
- Domain: Bacteria
- Kingdom: Pseudomonadati
- Phylum: Pseudomonadota
- Class: Gammaproteobacteria
- Order: Enterobacterales
- Family: Yersiniaceae
- Genus: Yersinia
- Species: Y. nurmii

Binomial name
- Yersinia nurmii Murros-Kontiainen et al., 2011

Species of bacterium

Yersinia nurmii is a Gram-negative species of Yersinia that was originally isolated in packaged broiler meat cuts. The type strain is APN3a-c (=DSM 22296 = LMG 25213).

== Etymology ==
Yersinia nurmii, N.L. gen. masc. n. nurmii, of Nurmi, in honor of Professor Esko Nurmi, a distinguished researcher in the field of food microbiology, who, with his colleagues, introduced the concept of competitive exclusion.
