= Rouxiella chamberiensis =

Scientific classification
- Domain: Bacteria
- Kingdom: Pseudomonadati
- Phylum: Pseudomonadota
- Class: Gammaproteobacteria
- Order: Enterobacterales
- Family: Yersiniaceae
- Genus: Rouxiella
- Species: R. chamberiensis

Binomial name
- Rouxiella chamberiensis Le Flèche-Matéos et al. 2015

Species of bacterium

Rouxiella chamberiensis is a member of the family Yersiniaceae. It is implicated in the deaths of three infants in France, and was found to be a contaminant of parenteral nutrition bags.
