= Yersinia aleksiciae =

Scientific classification
- Domain: Bacteria
- Kingdom: Pseudomonadati
- Phylum: Pseudomonadota
- Class: Gammaproteobacteria
- Order: Enterobacterales
- Family: Yersiniaceae
- Genus: Yersinia
- Species: Y. aleksiciae

Binomial name
- Yersinia aleksiciae Sprague and Neubauer, 2005

Gram-negative bacteria

Yersinia aleksiciae is a Gram-negative bacteria that is commonly isolated from the feces of warm-blooded animals such as humans, reindeers, and pigs. The type strain is Y159 (=WA758 =DSM 14987 =LMG 22254).

== Etymology ==
N.L. gen. fem. n. aleksiciae, of Aleksic, in honor of Professor Stojanka Aleksic, Hamburg, Germany for her studies on the epidemiology and microbiology of Yersinia.
