= Yersinia frederiksenii =

Scientific classification
- Domain: Bacteria
- Kingdom: Pseudomonadati
- Phylum: Pseudomonadota
- Class: Gammaproteobacteria
- Order: Enterobacterales
- Family: Yersiniaceae
- Genus: Yersinia
- Species: Y. frederiksenii

Binomial name
- Yersinia frederiksenii Ursing et al., 1980

Species of bacterium

Yersinia frederiksenii is a Gram-negative species of bacteria. It uses rhamnose and sucrose. Its type strain is strain 6175 (=CIP 80–29). In humans, it can cause gastrointestinal infections, while it has also been found in fish.
