= Yersinia rohdei =

Scientific classification
- Domain: Bacteria
- Kingdom: Pseudomonadati
- Phylum: Pseudomonadota
- Class: Gammaproteobacteria
- Order: Enterobacterales
- Family: Yersiniaceae
- Genus: Yersinia
- Species: Y. rohdei

Binomial name
- Yersinia rohdei Aleksic et al., 1987

Species of bacterium

Yersinia rohdei is a Gram-negative species of Yersinia that was originally isolated from the feces of humans and dogs in addition to water surfaces. The type strain is ATCC 43380 (=CCUG 38833 =CDC 3022-85 =CIP 103163 =DSM 18270 =H271-36/78 =JCM 7376 =LMG 8454). Y. rohdei strains have also been isolated from reindeer and kelp gull from the sub-Antarctica South Georgia island.

== Etymology ==
Yersinia rohdei, N.L. gen. masc. n. rohdei, of Rohde, named in honor of Rolf Rohde, who founded the National Reference Center for Salmonella in Hamburg, Germany, and who made many significant contributions to the diagnostic and serological identification of Enterobacteriaceae, especially Salmonella.
