= YopR bacterial protein domain =

YopR_core
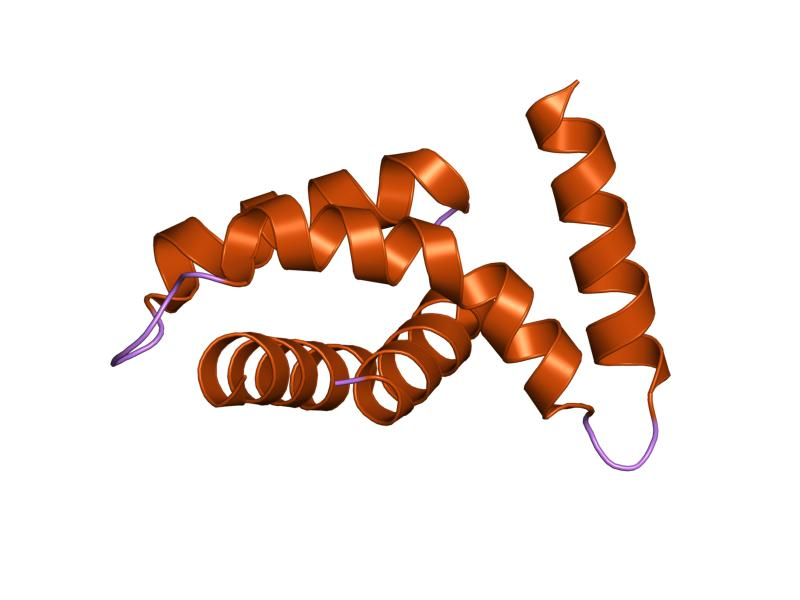
- crystal structure of the core domain of yersinia pestis virulence factor yopr

Identifiers
- Symbol: YopR_core
- Pfam: PF09025
- InterPro: IPR013349
Available protein structures:
- PDB: IPR013349 PF09025 (ECOD; PDBsum)
- AlphaFold: IPR013349; PF09025

In molecular biology, YopR is a protein domain commonly found in gram negative bacteria, in particular Yersinia and is a core domain. Proteins in this entry are type III secretion system effectors. They are named differently in different species and in Yersinia has been designated YopR (Yersinia outer protein R) which is encoded by the YscH (Yersinia secretion H) gene. This Yop protein is unusual in that it is released to the extracellular environment rather than injected directly into the target cell as are most Yop proteins. A hallmark of Yersinia type III machines is the presence of needles extending from the bacterial surface. Needles perform two functions, firstly, as a channel to export effectors into the immune cells and secondly as a sensor.

== Function ==
In summary, YopR may play a role in the regulation of type III secretion. The precise function of the YopR domain remains to be elucidated. YopR is thought to be involved in with YscF which develops needles. There are two different hypotheses for this. The first explanation is that YopR is possibly controlling the secretion of YscF, which impacts the assembly of type III machines. Alternatively, it is thought that YopR directly polymerizes YscF; this explanation is thought to be less likely since YopR does not associated with purified needles.

== Structure ==
YopR, is composed of five alpha-helices, four of which are arranged in an antiparallel bundle.

== Secretion systems ==
There have been four secretion systems described in animal enteropathogens, such as Salmonella and Yersinia, with further sequence similarities in plant pathogens like Ralstonia and Erwinia. This is useful for further work with the YopR protein domain as comparative sequence and structure homology can be made. The type III secretion system is of great interest, as the YopR protein domain plays an important role. The type III secretion system transports virulence factors from the pathogen directly into the host cell when the bacterium is in close contact with the host.
