= TyeA protein domain =

TyeA
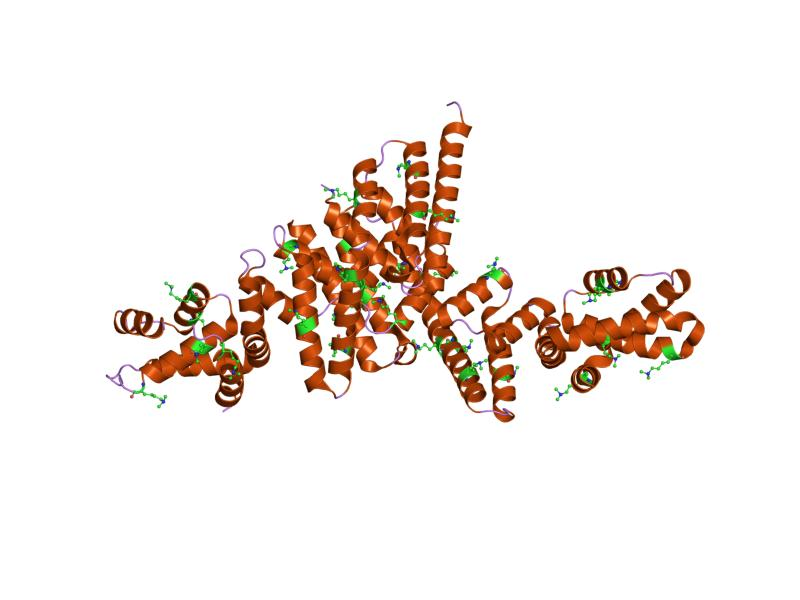
- complex structure of y.pestis virulence factors yopn and tyea

Identifiers
- Symbol: TyeA
- Pfam: PF09059
- InterPro: IPR015144
Available protein structures:
- PDB: IPR015144 PF09059 (ECOD; PDBsum)
- AlphaFold: IPR015144; PF09059

In molecular biology, the protein domain TyeA is short for Translocation of Yops into eukaryotic cells A. It controls the release of Yersinia outer proteins (Yops) which help Yersinia evade the immune system. More specifically, it interacts with the bacterial protein YopN via hydrophobic residues located on the helices.

== Function ==
This protein domain is involved in the control of Yop release. This helps it to evade the host's immune system. Yersinia spp. do this by injecting the effector Yersinia outer proteins (Yops) into the target cell. Also involved in Yop secretion are YopN and LcrG.

TyeA is also required for translocation of YopE and YopH. TyeA interacts with YopN and with YopD, a component of the translocation apparatus. This shows the complex which recognizes eukaryotic cells and controls Yop secretion is also actively involved in translocation.

== Localisation ==
Like YopN, TyeA is localized at the bacterial surface.

== Structure ==
The structure of TyeA is composed of two pairs of parallel alpha-helices.

== Mechanism ==
Association of TyeA with the C terminus of YopN is accompanied by conformational changes in both polypeptides that create order out of disorder: the resulting structure then serves as an impediment to type III secretion of YopN.
