= Hwp1 =

Protein found on the surface of Candida albicans

Hyphal wall protein 1

Identifiers
- Organism: Candida albicans (strain WO-1)
- Symbol: Hwp1
- UniProt: C4YHA6
Search for
- Structures: Swiss-model
- Domains: InterPro

Hyphal wall protein 1

Identifiers
- Organism: Candida albicans (strain SC5314)
- Symbol: Hwp1
- UniProt: P46593
Search for
- Structures: Swiss-model
- Domains: InterPro

Hwp1 (Hyphal wall protein 1) is a protein (glycoprotein) located on the surface of an opportunistic diploid fungus called Candida albicans.

This "hyphal" denomination is due to Hwp1 appearing exclusively on the surface of a projection called hyphae that emerges from the surface of this fungus.

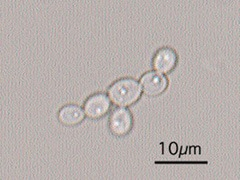
Candida Albicans Yeast forms (round-to-oval)

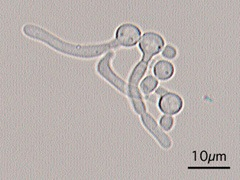
Candida Albicans Hyphal forms (filamentous projections called hyphaes emerging from round-to-oval forms)

Hwp1 is particularly important because it is a substrate of mammalian transglutaminase.

This transglutaminase ability has two implications, one (in fungus pathogenicity) proved, and the other (in food proteins potential pathogenicity) hypothetical.

== Fungus pathogenicity ==
Hwp1 has been proven to be involved in oral candidiasis. Candida albicans Hwp1 allows through the use of transglutaminase from the host (human beings, for example) to adhere to human epithelial cells with the strength of a covalent, isopeptide bond (the same strength in which human body proteins are built). This ability is highly related to Candida albicans being the prevalent Candida species in all types of candidiasis. Other candida species don't have the Hwp1 protein.

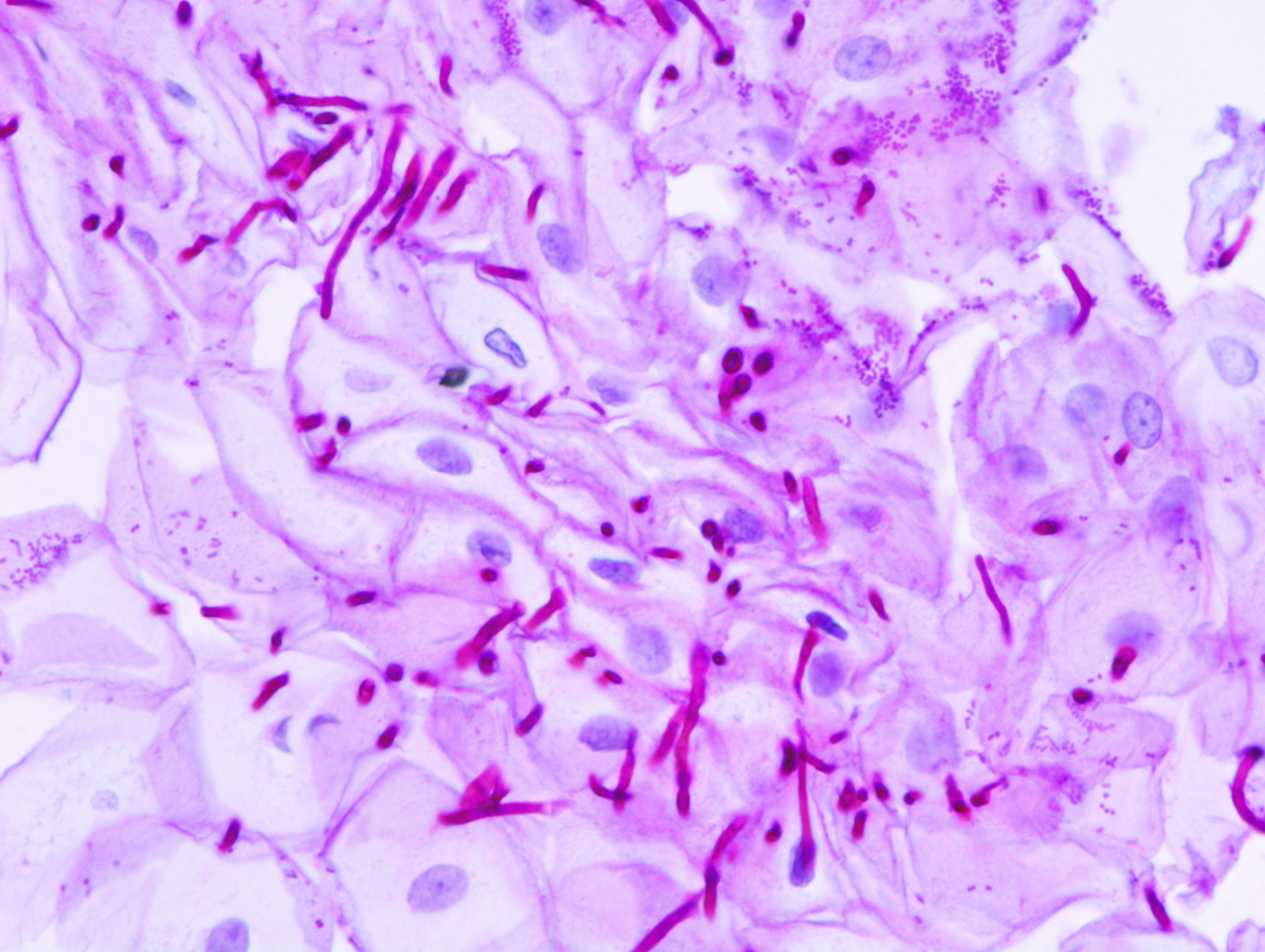
Micrograph of esophageal candidiasis showing hyphaes

== Hwp1 - Gluten molecular mimicry ==
Hwp1 of Candida albicans shares similar sequence homology of amino acids with gliadin (α- and γ-gliadins) of gluten protein. This homology appears between fragments of hwp1 sequence and α-gliadin and γ-gliadin T-cell epitopes in celiac disease.

== See also ==
- Adhesin molecule (immunoglobulin -like)
- Bacterial adhesin
- Cell adhesion
- Fungal adhesin
