= Yersinia intermedia =

Scientific classification
- Domain: Bacteria
- Kingdom: Pseudomonadati
- Phylum: Pseudomonadota
- Class: Gammaproteobacteria
- Order: Enterobacterales
- Family: Yersiniaceae
- Genus: Yersinia
- Species: Y. intermedia

Binomial name
- Yersinia intermedia Brenner et al., 1980

Species of bacterium

Yersinia intermedia is a Gram-negative species of bacteria which uses rhamnose, melibiose, and raffinose. Its type strain is strain 3953 (=CIP 80-28 =ATCC 29909 =Bottone 48 =Chester 48). It has been found in fish, and contains several biotypes. It is not considered of clinical relevance, being isolated from humans in a routine manner.
