= Yersinia alsatica =

Scientific classification
- Domain: Bacteria
- Kingdom: Pseudomonadati
- Phylum: Pseudomonadota
- Class: Gammaproteobacteria
- Order: Enterobacterales
- Family: Yersiniaceae
- Genus: Yersinia
- Species: Y. alsatica

Binomial name
- Yersinia alsatica Le Guern et al. 2020

Species of bacterium

Yersinia alsatica is a Gram-negative bacterium in the family Yersiniaceae that has been isolated from human stool.
