= Yersinia vastinensis =

Scientific classification
- Domain: Bacteria
- Kingdom: Pseudomonadati
- Phylum: Pseudomonadota
- Class: Gammaproteobacteria
- Order: Enterobacterales
- Family: Yersiniaceae
- Genus: Yersinia
- Species: Y. vastinensis

Binomial name
- Yersinia vastinensis Le Guern et al. 2020

Species of bacterium

Yersinia vastinensis is a Gram-negative species of bacteria that has been isolated from human stools. All reported strains were isolated in France.
