= HWP =

HWP may refer to:

== Science and technology ==
- Half-wave plate, an optical device
- Hangul (word processor), Korean software
- Hardy–Weinberg principle, in population genetics

== Other uses ==
- Heavy weapons platoon
- Highland Wildlife Park, in Scotland
- Human Waste Project, an American band
- Hungarian Workers' Party, a political party
- Hutchison Whampoa Property, a property developer in Hong Kong

== See also ==
- Hoop (disambiguation)
- Hwp1, fungal glycoprotein
