= Yersinia pekkanenii =

Scientific classification
- Domain: Bacteria
- Kingdom: Pseudomonadati
- Phylum: Pseudomonadota
- Class: Gammaproteobacteria
- Order: Enterobacterales
- Family: Yersiniaceae
- Genus: Yersinia
- Species: Y. pekkanenii

Binomial name
- Yersinia pekkanenii Murros-Kontiainen et al., 2011

Species of bacterium

Yersinia pekkanenii is a Gram-negative species of Yersinia that has been isolated from water, soil, and lettuce samples. The type strain is ÅYV7.1KOH2 (= DSM 22769 = LMG 25369).

== Etymology ==
Yersinia pekkanenii, N.L. gen. masc. n. pekkanenii, of Pekkanen, in honor of Professor Timo Pekkanen, who was a veterinarian and former head of the Department of Food and Environmental Hygiene in the Faculty of Veterinary Medicine of the University of Helsinki. He made a substantial contribution to the development of scientific research of food hygiene in Finland.
