= Yersinia massiliensis =

Scientific classification
- Domain: Bacteria
- Kingdom: Pseudomonadati
- Phylum: Pseudomonadota
- Class: Gammaproteobacteria
- Order: Enterobacterales
- Family: Yersiniaceae
- Genus: Yersinia
- Species: Y. massiliensis

Binomial name
- Yersinia massiliensis Merhej et al., 2008

Species of bacterium

Yersinia massiliensis is a Gram-negative bacteria that is commonly isolated from the environment and food. The type strain is CCUG 53443 (=CIP 109351 =DSM 21859).

== Etymology ==
Yersinia massiliensis, mas.si.li.en’sis N.L. masc./fem. adj. massiliensis, pertaining to Massilia, the ancient Roman name of Marseille, France, where the type strain was isolated.
