= Caf1 capsule antigen =

Antig_Caf1
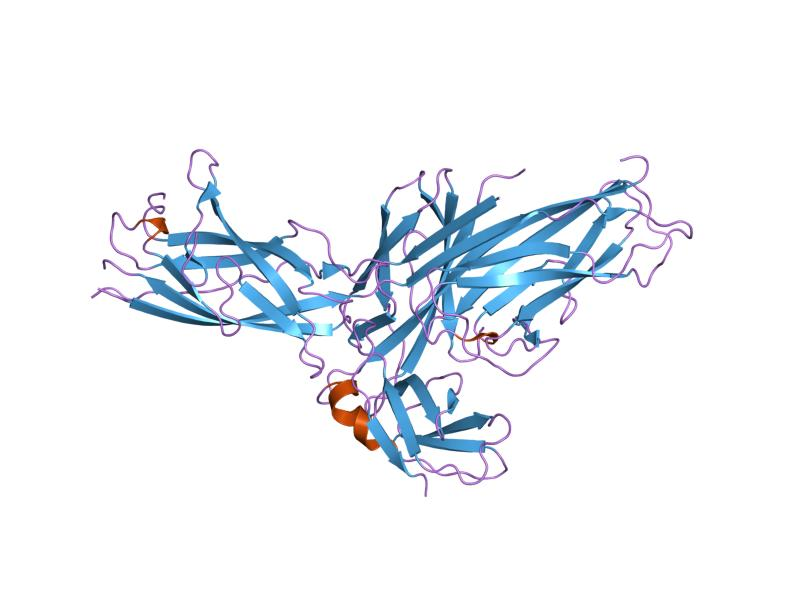
- x-ray structure of the ternary caf1m:caf1:caf1 chaperone:subunit:subunit complex

Identifiers
- Symbol: Antig_Caf1
- Pfam: PF09255
- InterPro: IPR015335
- SCOP2: 1p5v / SCOPe / SUPFAM
Available protein structures:
- PDB: IPR015335 PF09255 (ECOD; PDBsum)
- AlphaFold: IPR015335; PF09255

In molecular biology, Caf1 capsule antigen proteins are a family of the F1 capsule antigens Caf1 synthesised by Yersinia bacteria. They adopt a structure consisting of seven strands arranged in two beta-sheets, in a Greek-key topology, and mediate targeting of the bacterium to sites of infection.
