= Notifiable diseases in Norway =

Diseases which must be reported to Norwegian authorities

The Norwegian Institute of Public Health is responsible for maintaining and revising the list of notifiable diseases in Norway and participates in the European Centre for Disease Prevention and Control (ECDC) and the World Health Organization's surveillance of infectious diseases. The notifiable diseases are classified into Group A, Group B and Group C diseases, depending on the procedure for reporting the disease.

== Group A diseases ==
Group A diseases are reported with full patient identification by clinicians and laboratories. The copies of notifications are sent also to Municipal Medical Officer of the patient's municipality. As of 2018, 60 diseases have been classified as Group A diseases.

1. AIDS
2. Anthrax
3. Botulism
4. Brucellosis
5. Campylobacteriosis
6. Cholera
7. Co-infection HIV and tuberculosis
8. Cryptosporidiosis
9. Dengue fever
10. Diphtheria
11. Echinococcus
12. Enteropathogen E. coli enteritis
13. Giardiasis
14. Haemophilus influenzae, systemic disease
15. Hemorrhagic fever
16. Hemolytic uremic syndrome, diarrhoea associated
17. Hepatitis A
18. Hepatitis B
19. Hepatitis C
20. HPV-infection causing cancer or pre-cancerous lesions
21. Infection or carrier state of microbes with special resistance patterns
22. Infection or carrier state of methicillin-resistant Staphylococcus aureus (MRSA)
23. Infection or carrier state of Streptococcus pneumoniae with reduced susceptibility to penicillin
24. Infection or carrier state of vancomycin resistant Enterococcus
25. Influenza caused by virus with pandemic potential
26. Legionellosis
27. Leprosy
28. Listeriosis
29. Lyme borreliosis
30. Malaria
31. Measles
32. Meningococcal systemic disease
33. Mumps
34. Hemorrhagic fever with renal syndrome (Nephropathia epidemica)
35. Paratyphoid fever
36. Pertussis
37. Plague
38. Pneumococcal systemic disease
39. Poliomyelitis
40. Q-fever
41. Prion diseases
42. Rabies
43. Relapsing fever
44. Rubella
45. Salmonellosis
46. Severe acute respiratory syndrome (SARS)
47. Shigellosis
48. Smallpox
49. Streptococcus Group A systemic disease
50. Streptococcus Group B systemic disease
51. Tetanus
52. Trichinosis
53. Tuberculosis
54. Tularaemia
55. Typhoid fever
56. Typhus (epidemic)
57. Viral infections in the central nervous system
58. West Nile fever
59. Yellow fever
60. Yersiniosis

== Group B diseases ==
Group B diseases are reported to the Norwegian Institute of Public Health after de-identifying the patient. The month and year of birth, gender, and municipality are reported. Copies of the notifications from clinicians are sent to the Municipal Medical Officer in the patient's municipality. This group of diseases includes gonorrhoea, HIV infection and syphilis.

== Group C diseases ==
Group C diseases are de-identified and the number of patients is reported from medical microbiological laboratories. This group includes genital chlamydia, Clostridioides difficile infection, and influenza-like disease (ILI). The number of Clostridioides difficile cases is reported monthly, genital chlamydia numbers are reported annually and influenza-like disease is reported weekly.
