= Yersinia mollaretii =

Scientific classification
- Domain: Bacteria
- Kingdom: Pseudomonadati
- Phylum: Pseudomonadota
- Class: Gammaproteobacteria
- Order: Enterobacterales
- Family: Yersiniaceae
- Genus: Yersinia
- Species: Y. mollaretii

Binomial name
- Yersinia mollaretii Wauters et al. 1988

Species of bacterium

Yersinia mollaretii is a Gram-negative species of bacteria. The species is named after Henri Mollaret, the former head of the National Yersinia Center at Institut Pasteur.
