= Ewingella americana =

Scientific classification
- Domain: Bacteria
- Kingdom: Pseudomonadati
- Phylum: Pseudomonadota
- Class: Gammaproteobacteria
- Order: Enterobacterales
- Family: Yersiniaceae
- Genus: Ewingella
- Species: E. americana

Binomial name
- Ewingella americana Grimont et al. 1984

Species of bacterium

Ewingella americana is a Gram-negative rod, and the only species in the genus Ewingella. It was first identified and characterized in 1983. Ewingella is in the family Yersiniaceae. The organism is rarely reported as a human pathogen, though it has been isolated from a variety of clinical specimens, including wounds, sputum, urine, stool, blood, synovial fluid, conjunctiva, and peritoneal dialysate. The bacterium is named in honor of William H. Ewing, an American biologist who contributed to modern taxonomy.

== Epidemiology ==
Respiratory-tract infections following retainment in intensive-care units has been observed in several instances. A case of E. americana causing osteomyelitis and septic arthritis of the shoulder joint in a previous intravenous drug abuser has also been reported. Vascular bypass surgery is a reported risk factor for colonization. Debate currently exists as to this organism's predilection for immunocompromised patients.

== Pathophysiology and biochemistry ==
E. americana is an organism with simple nutritional needs that can survive in water and citrate solution, and preferentially grows at 4 °C. Domestic sources of water, including air conditioning units, ice baths, and wound irrigation systems, have been cited as sources of infection.

== Health studies ==
In 2025, a study from the Japan Advanced Institute of Science and Technology showed that a single dose of E. americana eliminated colorectal cancer tumors in mice.

The bacteria naturally sought out the low-oxygen environments inside solid tumors, multiplying rapidly inside the cancer site without harming healthy organs, it directly damaged and destroyed tumor cells (cytotoxic effect) but more importantly triggered T cells, B cells, and neutrophils to attack the cancer and establishes long-lasting immune memory to prevent tumor regrowth.
