= Fungal adhesin =

Fungal adhesins are proteins located on the surface of fungal cells, specifically found on the outside of the cell wall. They allow fungi to colonize various substrates and to bind to host tissues. Adhesion to tissue is an obligatory first step in pathogenesis by many yeasts. Adhesins also have other functions, such as mating and biofilm formation.

== Candida albicans ==
Candida albicans can cause opportunistic oral and genital infections in humans.

=== Hwp1 ===
Hwp1 is a fungal adhesin belonging to the opportunistic dimorphic fungus Candida albicans. Hwp1 is unique among fungal adhesins discovered to date in that it is a mammalian transglutaminase substrate. The host enzyme allows C. albicans to form covalent bonds to the host tissue via Hwp1.

== See also ==
- Adhesin molecule (immunoglobulin -like)
- Bacterial adhesin
- Cell adhesion
