= Samsonia =

Scientific classification
- Domain: Bacteria
- Kingdom: Pseudomonadati
- Phylum: Pseudomonadota
- Class: Gammaproteobacteria
- Order: Enterobacterales
- Family: Yersiniaceae
- Genus: Samsonia; Sutra et al. 2001

Species
- Samsonia erythrinae

Genus of bacteria

Samsonia is a genus of Gram-negative bacteria in the family Yersiniaceae. Species within this genus were originally found in the bark of diseased Erythrina trees. Among bacterial plant pathogens within the Enterobacterales, Samsonia species may be most closely related to Pectobacterium species. Until now, only one species of this genus has been described (S. erythrinae).
