= Adhesion molecule (immunoglobulin-like) =

Protein domain

Adhes-Ig_like
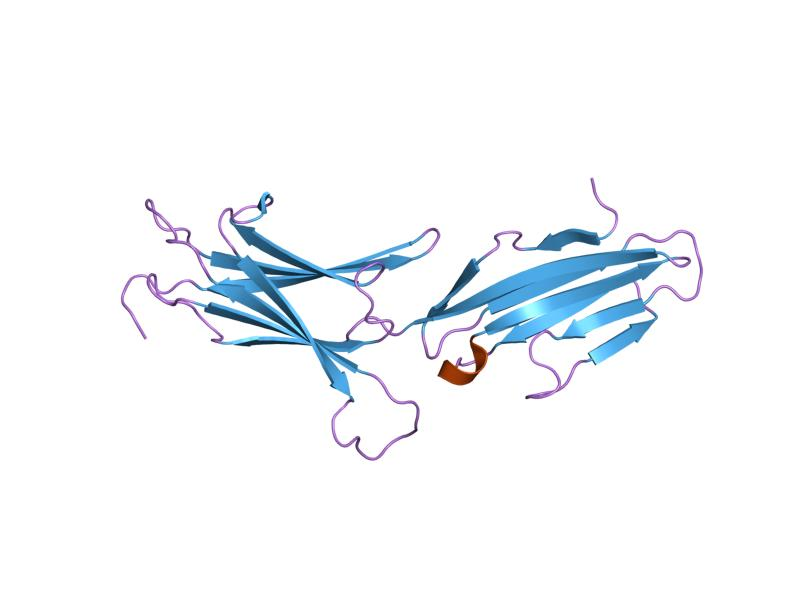
- a reassessment of the madcam-1 structure and its role in integrin recognition.

Identifiers
- Symbol: Adhes-Ig_like
- Pfam: PF09085
- Pfam clan: CL0159
- InterPro: IPR015169
- SCOP2: 1gsm / SCOPe / SUPFAM
Available protein structures:
- PDB: IPR015169 PF09085 (ECOD; PDBsum)
- AlphaFold: IPR015169; PF09085

In molecular biology, the adhesin molecule (immunoglobulin-like) is a protein domain. This domain is found in mucosal vascular addressin cell adhesion molecule 1 proteins (MAdCAM-1). These are cell adhesion molecules expressed on the endothelium in mucosa that guide the specific homing of lymphocytes into mucosal tissues. MAdCAM-1 belongs to a subclass of the immunoglobulin superfamily (IgSF), the members of which are ligands for integrins. The crystal structure of this domain has been reported; it adopts an immunoglobulin-like beta-sandwich structure, with seven strands arranged in two beta-sheets in a Greek key topology.

== See also ==
- Bacterial adhesin
- Cell adhesion
- Fungal adhesin
