= Rouxiella =

Scientific classification
- Domain: Bacteria
- Kingdom: Pseudomonadati
- Phylum: Pseudomonadota
- Class: Gammaproteobacteria
- Order: Enterobacterales
- Family: Yersiniaceae
- Genus: Rouxiella; Le Flèche-Matéos et al. 2015

Species
- Rouxiella aceris Rouxiella badensis Rouxiella chamberiensis Rouxiella silvae

Genus of bacteria

Rouxiella is a genus of Gram-negative bacteria in the family Yersiniaceae. Members of this genus are rod-shaped, non-motile, and do not form spores. Colonies of genus Rouxiella are yellow or white colored. They are facultatively anaerobic and can grow in the temperature range of 4–30 °C (39–86 °F). The genus is named for Émile Roux, a French bacteriologist and a close collaborator of Louis Pasteur.

The type species, Rouxiella chamberiensis, was originally isolated from "parenteral nutrition bags used for premature newborns in neonatal intensive care units in Chambéry Hospital," and originally published in 2015. R. badensis and R. silvae were originally isolated from a peat bog, and R. aceris was isolated from tree sap.
