= Chimaeribacter =

Scientific classification
- Domain: Bacteria
- Kingdom: Pseudomonadati
- Phylum: Pseudomonadota
- Class: Gammaproteobacteria
- Order: Enterobacterales
- Family: Yersiniaceae
- Genus: Chimaeribacter; Rossi and Fisher 2020

Type species
- Chimaeribacter arupi Rossi and Fisher 2020

Species
- C. arupi; C. californicus; C. coloradensis

Genus of bacteria

Chimaeribacter is a genus of Gram-negative bacteria in the family Yersiniaceae. Species within this genus were isolated from clinical samples that were submitted to ARUP laboratories between 2012 and 2016 and have traits of several bacteria genera.
