= Yersinia kristensenii =

Scientific classification
- Domain: Bacteria
- Kingdom: Pseudomonadati
- Phylum: Pseudomonadota
- Class: Gammaproteobacteria
- Order: Enterobacterales
- Family: Yersiniaceae
- Genus: Yersinia
- Species: Y. kristensenii

Binomial name
- Yersinia kristensenii Bercovier et al., 1980

Species of bacterium

Yersinia kristensenii is a species of bacteria. It is Gram-negative and its type strain is 105 (=CIP 80–30). It is potentially infectious to mice. It secretes a bacteriocin that targets related species.
