= Yersinia pseudotuberculosis =

Scientific classification
- Domain: Bacteria
- Kingdom: Pseudomonadati
- Phylum: Pseudomonadota
- Class: Gammaproteobacteria
- Order: Enterobacterales
- Family: Yersiniaceae
- Genus: Yersinia
- Species: Y. pseudotuberculosis

Binomial name
- Yersinia pseudotuberculosis (Pfeiffer 1889); Smith & Thal 1965

Type strain
- ATCC 29833; CCUG 5855; CIP 55.85; DSM 8992; JCM 1676; NCTC 10275

Synonyms
- Pasteurella lymphangitidis Sneath and Stevens 1990

Species of bacterium

Yersinia pseudotuberculosis is a Gram-negative bacterium that infects mammals (including humans) and birds. It causes the zoonotic yersiniosis and Far East scarlet-like fever in humans. Consequences in animals range from acute (sepsis and multi-organ failure) to chronic (necrotic abscessation in various organs). In both humans and non-human animals, it is mainly acquired from contaminated food, either via the fecal-oral route or by consumption of infected animals.

Typical strains of Y. pseudotuberculosis can be differentiated from the closely related Y. pestis and Y. similis by biochemical tests: this species can ferment both melibiose and rhamnose. It is urease-positive.

== Pathogenesis ==
Y. pseudotuberculosis can affect both mammals and birds. Clinical yersiniosis has high mortality in most animal species (there is a lack of study reporting its presence or absence in asymptomatic animals).

In mammals the symptoms observed before death are usually limited to low appetite, lethargy, and diarrhea. Animals may also die without exhibiting any obvious symptoms beforehand. Some animals live long enough for other symptoms to show up, e.g. necrotic abcesses in organs, abortion, and jaundice.

Non-human primates can, too, die before exhibiting obvious symptoms. Recorded symptoms include diarrhea (sometimes bloody), various sickness behavior (low energy, low appetite, depression), significant weight loss, dehydration, and hypothermia. Occasionally there are rashes, erythema nodosum, and arthritis just like in human "Izumi fever". The ypmA gene may be responsible.

Birds generally die without warning, or after only exhibiting lethargy, diarrhea, and low appetite.

Many white-yellow nodules can be seen in various organs during post-mortem examination. These nodules resembles the tubercles of tuberculosis, hence the name. In non-primate mammals the presentation is mainly gastrointestinal, manifesting as ulcerative enteritis, mesenteric lymphadenomegaly, and hepatitis. In birds it is more commonly lymphoreticular with hepatitis and splenitis. However, lymphoreticular presentation can also appear in birds and vice versa.

Definite diagnosis is by a polymerase chain reaction (PCR) setup that detects the pYV. Identifying by culturing from feces is possible but slow and difficult. Whether the diagnosis can be made antemortem is a different matter.

=== Humans ===
Symptoms of infection by non-YPM-carrying Y. pseudotuberculosis are similar to those of infection with Yersinia enterocolitica (fever and right-sided abdominal pain), except that the diarrheal component is often absent, which sometimes makes the resulting condition difficult to diagnose. Y. pseudotuberculosis infections can mimic appendicitis, especially in children and younger adults. In rare cases there may be spread of bacteria to the blood (bacteremia).

East Asian strains of Y. pseudotuberculosis carry a YPM gene that causes overactivation of the immune system, leading to additional skin complaints (erythema nodosum), joint stiffness and pain (reactive arthritis), even Kawasaki disease. This is called "Far East scarlet-like fever" (FESF) or "Izumi fever".

In any case, infection usually becomes apparent five to 10 days after exposure and typically lasts one to three weeks without treatment. In complex cases or those involving immunocompromised patients, antibiotics may be necessary for resolution; ampicillin, aminoglycosides, tetracycline, chloramphenicol, or a cephalosporin may all be effective.

The symptoms of fever and abdominal pain mimicking appendicitis (actually from mesenteric lymphadenitis) associated with Y. pseudotuberculosis infection are not typical of the diarrhea and vomiting from classical food poisoning incidents. Although Y. pseudotuberculosis is usually only able to colonize hosts by peripheral routes and cause serious disease in immunocompromised individuals, if this bacterium gains access to the blood stream, it has an LD_{50} comparable to Y. pestis at only 10 CFU.

== Relationship to Y. pestis ==
Genetically, the pathogen causing plague, Y. pestis, is very similar to Y. pseudotuberculosis. The plague appears to have diverged from Y. pseudotuberculosis relatively recently – about 1,500 to 20,000 years ago, and shortly before the first historically recorded outbreaks in humans. A 2015 paper in Cell estimated a divergence around 6,000 years ago. These modern estimates differ dramatically from earlier suggestions in popular scientific literature which claimed that Y. pestis evolved in rodents "millions of years ago."

== Virulence factors ==
To facilitate attachment, invasion, and colonization of its host, this bacterium possesses many virulence factors including a superantigen, adhesins, and secreted Yops (Yersinia outer proteins). Most of them are located on a plasmid called pYV (plasmid, Yersinia virulence).

Y. pseudotuberculosis can live extracellularly due to its formidable mechanisms of phagocytosis and opsonisation resistance through the expression of Yops and the type III pathway; yet, by limited pYV action, it can populate host cells, especially macrophages, intracellularly to further evade immune responses and be disseminated throughout the body.

=== pYV ===
pYV is a 70-kilobase plasmid found across almost all pathogenic Yersinia and its loss renders these species avirluent. It encodes the Yops and the type III secretion system (ysc, "Yersinia secretion") for injecting these pathogenic proteins into the cytoplasm of victim cells. Due to historical reasons, a number of regulatory genes are also named ysc and some translocation genes under yop: for example, YopB and YopD function as chaperones responsible for helping the peptide fit through the narrow "needle".

The core region also includes yopN, yopB, yopD, tyeA, lcrG, and lcrV, which also regulate Yops gene expression and help to translocate secretory Yops to the target cell. For example, YopN and TyeA are positioned as a plug on the apparatus so only their conformational change, induced by their interaction with certain host cell membrane proteins, will cause the unblocking of the secretory pathway. Secretion is regulated in this fashion so that proteins are not expelled into the extracellular matrix and elicit an immune response. Since this pathway gives secretion selectivity, it is a virulence factor.

=== Effector Yops ===
In contrast to the ysc and yop genes listed above, the Yops that act directly on host cells to cause cytopathologic effects – "effector Yops" – are encoded by pYV genes external to this core region. The sole exception is LcrV, which is also known as the "versatile Yop" for its two roles as an effector Yop and as a regulatory Yop. The combined function of these effector Yops permits the bacteria to resist internalization by immune and intestinal cells and to evade the bactericidal actions of neutrophils and macrophages. Inside the bacterium, these Yops are bound by pYV-encoded Sycs (specific Yop chaperones), which prevent premature interaction with other proteins and guide the Yops to a type-III secretory apparatus. In addition to the Syc-Yop complex, Yops are also tagged for type III secretion either by the first 60nt in their corresponding mRNA transcript or by their corresponding first 20 N-terminal amino acids.

LcrV, YopQ, YopE, YopT, YopH, YpkA, YopJ, YopM, and YadA are all secreted by the type-III secretory pathway. LcrV inhibits neutrophil chemotaxis and cytokine production, allowing Y. pseudotuberculosis to form large colonies without inducing systemic failure and, with YopQ, contributes to the translocation process by bringing YopB and YopD to the eukaryotic cell membrane for pore-formation. By causing actin filament depolymerisation, YopE, YopT, and YpkA resist endocytosis by intestinal cells and phagocytosis while giving cytotoxic changes in the host cell. YopT targets Rho GTPase, commonly named "RhoA", and uncouples it from the membrane, leaving it in an inactive RhoA-GDI (guanine nucleotide dissociation inhibitor)-bound state whereas YopE and YpkA convert Rho proteins to their inactive GDP-bound states by expressing GTPase activity. YpkA also catalyses serine autophosphorylation, so it may have regulatory functions in Yersinia or undermine host cell immune response signal cascades since YpkA is targeted to the cytoplasmic side of the host cell membrane. YopH acts on host focal adhesion sites by dephosphorylating several phosphotyrosine residues on focal adhesion kinase (FAK) and the focal adhesion proteins paxillin and p130. Since FAK phosphorylation is involved in uptake of yersiniae as well as T cell and B cell responses to antigen-binding, YopH elicits antiphagocytic and other anti-immune effects. YopJ, which shares an operon with YpkA, "...interferes with the mitogen-activated protein (MAP) kinase activities of c-Jun N-terminal kinase (JNK), p38, and extracellular signal-regulated kinase", leading to macrophage apoptosis. In addition, YopJ inhibits TNF-α release from many cell types, possibly through an inhibitory action on NF-κB, suppressing inflammation and the immune response. By secretion through a type III pathway and localization in the nucleus by a vesicle-associated, microtubule-dependent method, YopM may alter host cell growth by binding to RSK (ribosomal S6 kinase), which regulates cell cycle regulation genes. YadA has lost its adhesion, opsonisation-resisting, phagocytosis-resisting, and respiratory burst-resisting functions in Y. pseudotuberculosis due to a frameshift mutation by a single base-pair deletion in yadA in comparison to yadA in Y. enterocolitica, yet it still is secreted by type III secretion. The yop genes, yadA, ylpA, and the virC operon are considered the "Yop regulon" since they are coregulated by pYV-encoded VirF. virF is in turn thermoregulated. At 37 degrees Celsius, chromosomally encoded Ymo, which regulates DNA supercoiling around the virF gene, changes conformation, allowing for virF expression, which then up-regulates the Yop regulon.

=== Adhesion ===
Y. pseudotuberculosis adheres strongly to intestinal cells via chromosomally encoded proteins so that Yop secretion may occur, to avoid being removed by peristalsis, and to invade target host cells. A transmembrane protein, invasin, facilitates these functions by binding to host cell αβ1 integrins. Through this binding, the integrins cluster, thereby activating FAK, and causing a corresponding reorganization of the cytoskeleton. Subsequent internalization of bound bacteria occurs when the actin-depolymerising Yops are not being expressed. The protein encoded on the "attachment invasion locus" named Ail also bestows attachment and invasive abilities upon Yersiniae while interfering with the binding of complement on the bacterial surface. To increase binding specificity, the fibrillar pH6 antigen targets bacteria to target intestinal cells only when thermoinduced.

=== Superantigen ===
Y. pseudotuberculosis mitogen
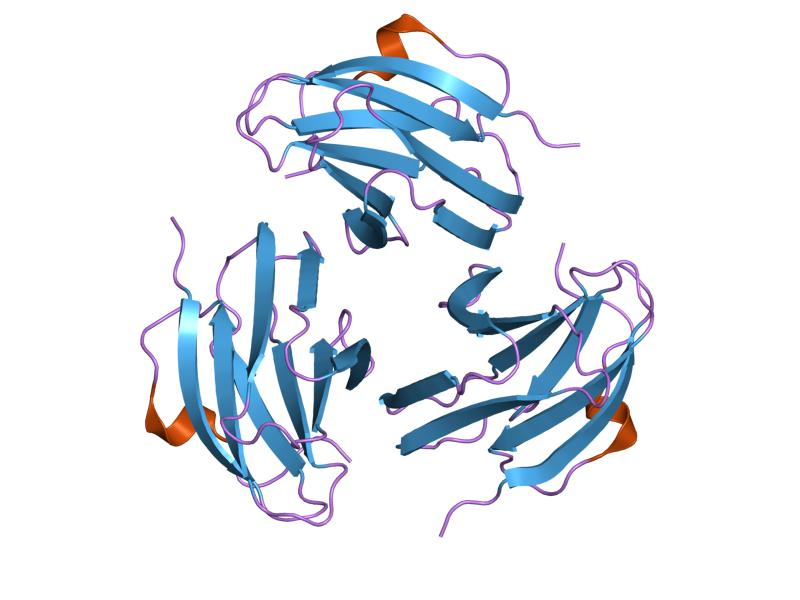
- crystal structure of yersinia pseudotuberculosis-derived mitogen (ypm)

Identifiers
- Symbol: YpM
- Pfam: PF09144
- InterPro: IPR015227
- SCOP2: 1pm4 / SCOPe / SUPFAM
Available protein structures:
- PDB: IPR015227 PF09144 (ECOD; PDBsum)
- AlphaFold: IPR015227; PF09144

Some strains carry a family of superantigenic exotoxin known as YPM, for Y. pseudotuberculosis-derived mitogen. They bind to T cell receptors containing the Vβ3, Vβ7, Vβ8, Vβ9, Vβ13.1, and Vβ13.2 variable regions, causing the cells with those receptors to proliferate out of control. There is a CD4+ T cell preference, although activation of some CD8+ T cells occurs. This T cell expansion can cause splenomegaly coupled with inflammatory cytokine (e.g. IL-2 and IL-4) overproduction. In vitro, anti-TNF-α and anti-IFN-γ monoclonal antibodies neutralizes YPM toxicity.

YPM is likely responsible for the signs of immune system overactivation (rashes, arthritis, etc.) in both humans and non-human primates. As much as 95% of East Asian strains carry some form of YPM while almost no Western strain does; accordingly, the symptom of Y. pseudotuberculosis is mainly gastrointestinal in the West but escalates to the so-called "Far Eastern scarlet-like fever" in the east.

The superantigen is encoded on the main chromosome.

==== Structure ====
YPM adopts a sandwich structure consisting of 9 strands in two beta sheets, in a jelly roll fold topology. The molecular weight is about 14 kDa. Structurally, it is unlike any other superantigen, but is remarkably similar to the tumour necrosis factor and viral capsid proteins. This suggests a possible evolutionary relationship.

==== Subfamilies ====
YPM has been divided into three families, YPMa, YPMb, YPMc.

=== Small non-coding RNA ===
Numerous bacterial small non-coding RNAs have been identified to play regulatory functions. Some can regulate the virulence genes. 150 unannotated sRNAs were identified by sequencing of Y. pseudotuberculosis RNA libraries from bacteria grown at 26 °C and 37 °C, suggesting they may play a role in pathogenesis. By using single-molecule fluorescence in situ hybridisation smFISH technique it was shown that the number of YSR35 RNA increased 2.5 times upon temperature shift from 25 °C to 37 °C. Another study uncovered that a temperature-induced global reprogramming of central metabolic functions are likely to support intestinal colonization of the pathogen. Environmentally controlled regulatory RNAs coordinate control of metabolism and virulence allowing rapid adaptation and high flexibility during life-style changes. High-throughput RNA structure probing identified many thermoresponsive RNA structures.

=== pVM82 ===
pVM82 is a plasmid of about 150 kbp. It encodes a type IV secretion system (specifically IVB) suspected to play a role in the Far Eastern scarlet-like fever.

== See also ==
- Intergenic RNA thermometer
