= Bacterial adhesin =

Bacterial adhesins are cell-surface proteins of bacteria that facilitate adhesion or adherence to other cells or to surfaces, usually in the host they are infecting or living in. Adhesins are a type of virulence factor.

Adherence is an essential step in bacterial pathogenesis or infection, required for colonizing a new host. Adhesion and bacterial adhesins are also a potential target either for prophylaxis or for the treatment of bacterial infections.

== Background ==
Bacteria are typically found attached to and living in close association with surfaces. During the bacterial lifespan, a bacterium is subjected to frequent shear-forces. In the crudest sense, bacterial adhesins serve as anchors allowing bacteria to overcome these environmental shear forces, thus remaining in their desired environment. However, bacterial adhesins do not serve as a sort of universal bacterial Velcro. Rather, they act as specific surface recognition molecules, allowing the targeting of a particular bacterium to a particular surface such as root tissue in plants, lacrimal duct tissues in mammals, or even tooth enamel.

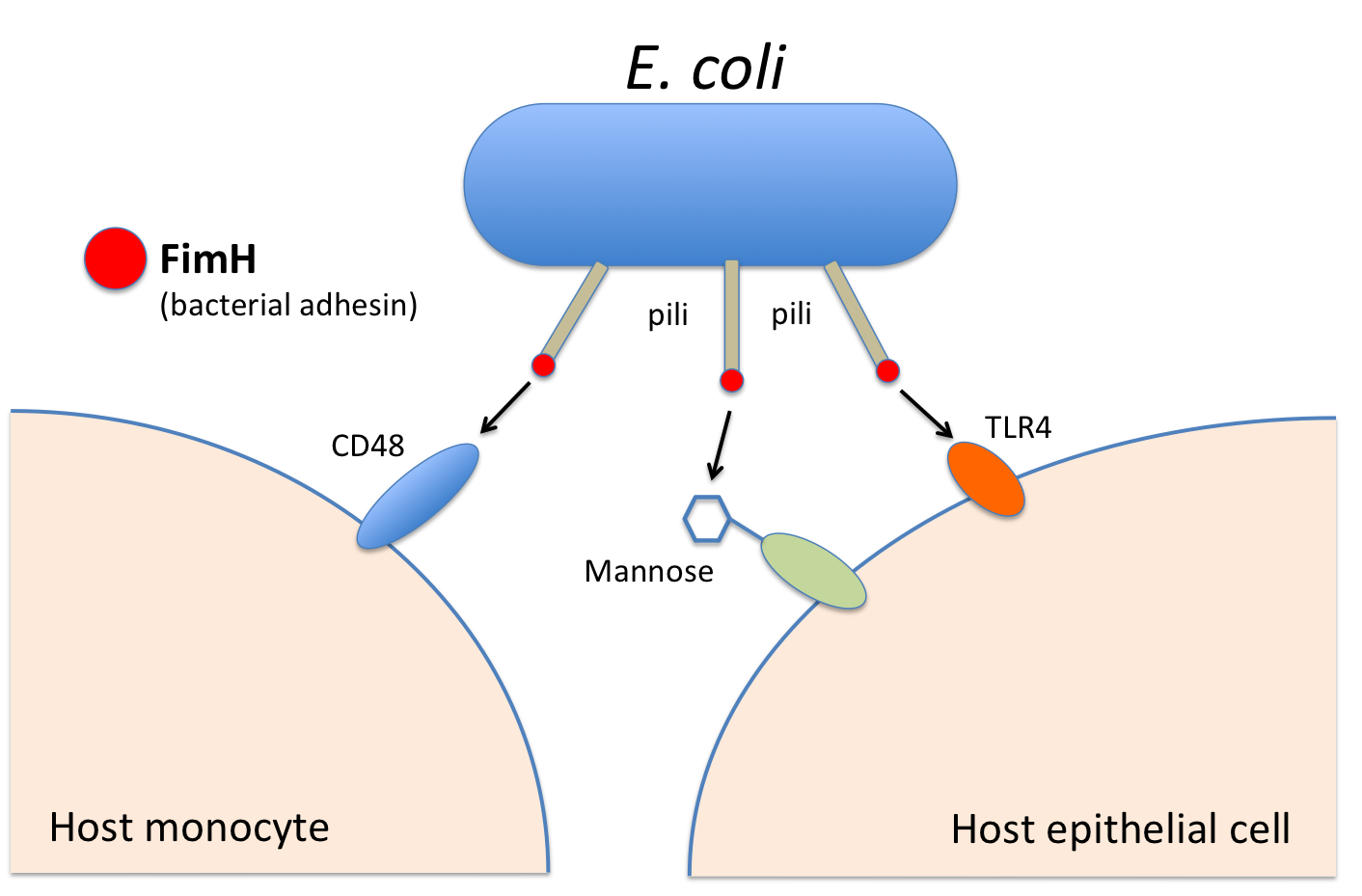
FimH is a bacterial adhesin that helps bacteria such as Escherichia coli to bind to host cells and their receptors (here: the human proteins CD48 and TLR4, or mannose residues).

Most fimbria of gram-negative bacteria function as adhesins, but in many cases it is a minor subunit protein at the tip of the fimbriae that is the actual adhesin. In gram-positive bacteria, a protein or polysaccharide surface layer serves as the specific adhesin. To effectively achieve adherence to host surfaces, many bacteria produce multiple adherence factors called adhesins.

Bacterial adhesins provide species and tissue tropism. Adhesins are expressed by both pathogenic bacteria and saprophytic bacteria. This prevalence marks them as key microbial virulence factors in addition to a bacterium's ability to produce toxins and resist the immune defenses of the host.

== Structures ==
Through the mechanisms of evolution, different species of bacteria have developed different solutions to the problem of attaching receptor specific proteins to the bacteria surface. Today many different types and subclasses of bacterial adhesins may be observed in the literature.

The typical structure of a bacterial adhesin is that of a fimbria or pilus. The bacterial adhesin consists primarily of an intramembranous structural protein which provides a scaffold upon which several extracellular adhesins may be attached. However, as in the case of the CFA1 fimbriae, the structural protein itself can sometimes act as an adhesin if a portion of the protein extends into the extracellular matrix (ECM).

=== FimH adhesin—structure ===
The best characterized bacterial adhesin is the type 1 fimbrial FimH adhesin. This adhesin is responsible for D-mannose sensitive adhesion. The bacterium synthesizes a precursor protein consisting of 300 amino acids then processes the protein by removing several signal peptides ultimately leaving a 279 amino acid protein. Mature FimH is displayed on the bacterial surface as a component of the type 1 fimbrial organelle.

In 1999, the structure of FimH was resolved via x-ray crystallography. FimH is folded into two domains. The N terminal adhesive domain plays the main role in surface recognition while the C-terminal domain is responsible for organelle integration. A tetra-peptide loop links the two domains. Additionally, a carbohydrate-binding pocket has been identified at the tip of the N-terminal adhesive domain. This basic structure is conserved across type 1 fimbrial adhesins though recent studies have shown that in vitro induced mutations can lead to the addition of C-terminal domain specificity resulting in a bacterial adhesion with dual bending sites and related binding phenotypes.

== As virulence factors ==
The majority of bacterial pathogens exploit specific adhesion to host cells as their main virulence factor. "A large number of bacterial adhesins with individual receptor specificities have been identified." Many bacterial pathogens are able to express an array of different adhesins. Expression of these adhesins at different phases during infection play the most important role in adhesion based virulence. Numerous studies have shown that inhibiting a single adhesin in this coordinated effort can often be enough to make a pathogenic bacterium non-virulent. This has led to the exploration of adhesin activity interruption as a method of bacterial infection treatment.

== Vaccines based on adhesins ==
The study of adhesins as a point of exploitation for vaccines comes from early studies which indicated that an important component of protective immunity against certain bacteria came from an ability to prevent adhesin binding. Additionally, adhesins are attractive vaccine candidates because they are often essential to infection and are surface-located, making them readily accessible to antibodies.

The effectiveness of anti-adhesin antibodies is illustrated by studies with FimH, the adhesin of uropathogenic Escherichia coli (UPEC). Work with E. coli stems from observations of human acquired immunity. Children in third world countries may suffer from several episodes of E. coli associated diarrhea during the first three years of life. If the child survives this initial period of susceptibility, infection rates typically drop substantially. Field studies show that this acquired immunity is directed primarily against bacterial adhesins.

Recent studies from Worcester Polytechnic Institute show that the consumption of cranberry juice may inhibit the action of UPEC adhesins. Using atomic force microscopy researchers have shown that adhesion forces decrease with time following cranberry juice consumption. This research has opened the door to further exploration of orally administered vaccines which exploit bacterial adhesins.

A number of problems create challenges for the researcher exploring the anti-adhesin immunity concept. First, a large number of different bacterial adhesins target the same human tissues. Further, an individual bacterium can produce multiple different types of adhesin, at different times, in different places, and in response to different environmental triggers. Finally, many adhesins present as different immunologically distinct antigenic varieties, even within the same clone (as is the case in Neisseria gonorrhoeae).

Despite these challenges, progress is being made in the creation of anti-adhesion vaccines. In animal models, passive immunization with anti FimH-antibodies and vaccination with the protein significantly reduced colonization by UPEC. Moreover, the Bordetella pertussis adhesins FHA and pertactin are components of three of the four acellular pertussis vaccines currently licensed for use in the U.S. Additionally, anti-adhesion vaccines are being explored as a solution to urinary tract infection (UTI). The use of synthetic FimH adhesion peptides was shown to prevent urogenital mucosal infection by E. coli in mice.

== Specific examples ==
=== Dr family ===
Adhesin_Dr
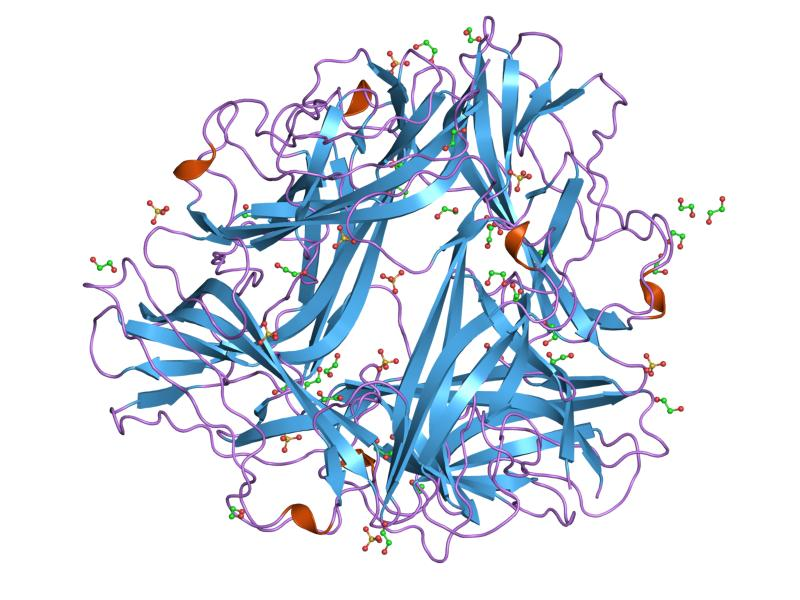
- drae adhesin from escherichia coli

Identifiers
- Symbol: Adhesin_Dr
- Pfam: PF04619
- Pfam clan: CL0204
- InterPro: IPR006713
Available protein structures:
- PDB: IPR006713 PF04619 (ECOD; PDBsum)
- AlphaFold: IPR006713; PF04619

The Dr family of adhesins bind to the Dr blood group antigen component of decay-accelerating factor (DAF). These proteins contain both fimbriated and afimbriated adherence structures and mediate adherence of uropathogenic Escherichia coli to the urinary tract. They do so by inducing the development of long cellular extensions that wrap around the bacteria. They also confer the mannose-resistant hemagglutination phenotype, which can be inhibited by chloramphenicol. The N-terminal portion of the mature protein is thought to be responsible for chloramphenicol sensitivity. Also, they induce activation of several signal transduction cascades, including activation of PI-3 kinase.

The Dr family of adhesins are particularly associated with cystitis and pregnancy-associated pyelonephritis.

=== Multivalent adhesion molecules ===
Multivalent adhesion molecules (MAMs) are a widespread family of adhesins found in Gram negative bacteria, including E. coli, Vibrio, Yersinia, and Pseudomonas aeruginosa. MAMs contain tandem repeats of mammalian cell entry (MCE) domains which specifically bind to extracellular matrix proteins and anionic lipids on host tissues. Since they are abundant in many pathogens of clinical importance, multivalent adhesion molecules are a potential target for prophylactic or therapeutic anti-infectives. The use of a MAM targeting adhesion inhibitor was shown to significantly decrease the colonization of burn wounds by multidrug resistant Pseudomonas aeruginosa in rats.

=== N. gonorroheae ===
N. gonorrhoeae is host restricted almost entirely to humans. "Extensive studies have established type 4 fimbrial adhesins of N. gonorrhoeae virulence factors." These studies have shown that only strains capable of expressing fimbriae are pathogenic. High survival of polymorphonuclear neutrophils (PMNs) characterizes Neisseria gonorrhoeae infections. Additionally, recent studies out of Stockholm have shown that Neisseria can hitchhike on PMNs using their adhesin pili thus hiding them from neutrophil phagocytic activity. This action facilitates the spread of the pathogen throughout the epithelial cell layer.

=== E. coli ===
Escherichia coli strains most known for causing diarrhea can be found in the intestinal tissue of pigs and humans where they express the K88 antigen and CFA1 protein to attach to the intestinal lining. Additionally, UPEC causes about 90% of urinary tract infections. Of those E. coli which cause UTIs, 95% express type 1 fimbriae. FimH in E. coli overcomes the antibody based immune response by natural conversion from the high to the low affinity state. Through this conversion, FimH adhesion may shed the antibodies bound to it. Escherichia coli FimH provides an example of conformation specific immune response which enhances impact on the protein. By studying this particular adhesion, researchers hope to develop adhesion-specific vaccines which may serve as a model for antibody-mediation of pathogen adhesion.

== See also ==
- Fungal adhesin
- Trimeric autotransporter adhesins (TAA)
