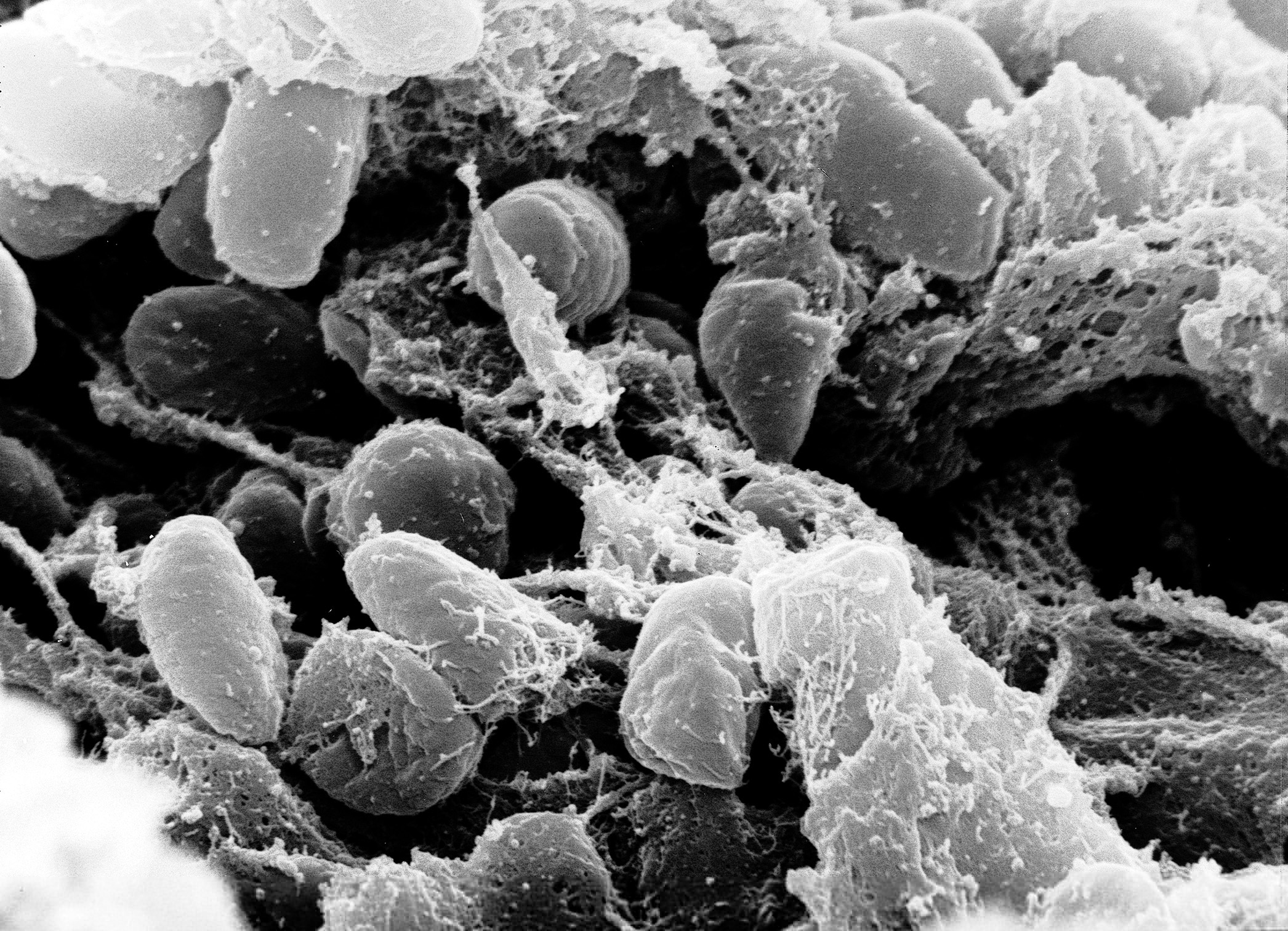

Scientific classification
- Domain: Bacteria
- Kingdom: Pseudomonadati
- Phylum: Pseudomonadota
- Class: Gammaproteobacteria
- Order: Enterobacterales
- Family: Yersiniaceae
- Genus: Yersinia van Loghem, 1944

Species
- Y. aldovae; Y. aleksiciae; Y. alsatica; Y. artesiana; Y. bercovieri; Y. canariae; Y. enterocolitica; Y. entomophaga; Y. frederiksenii; Y. hibernica; Y. intermedia; Y. kristensenii; Y. massiliensis; Y. mollaretii; Y. nurmii; Y. pekkanenii; Y. pestis; Y. proxima; Y. pseudotuberculosis; Y. rochesterensis; Y. rohdei; Y. ruckeri; Y. similis; Y. thracica; Y. vastinensis; Y. wautersii

= Yersinia =

Genus of bacteria

Yersinia is a genus of bacteria in the family Yersiniaceae. Yersinia species are Gram-negative, coccobacilli bacteria, and are facultative anaerobes. Three members of Yersinia are pathogenic in humans: Y. pestis causes the plague and Y. enterocolitica and Y. pseudotuberculosis cause gastrointestinal syndromes. Rodents are the natural reservoirs of Yersinia; less frequently, other mammals serve as the host. Infection may occur either through blood (in the case of Y. pestis) or in an alimentary fashion, occasionally via consumption of food products (especially vegetables, milk-derived products, and meat) contaminated with infected urine or feces.

Speculations exist as to whether or not certain Yersinia can also be spread by protozoonotic mechanisms, since Yersinia species are known to be facultative intracellular parasites; currently, there are studies and discussions of the possibility of amoeba-vectored (through the cyst form of the protozoan) Yersinia propagation and proliferation.

== Microbial physiology ==
An interesting feature peculiar to some of the Yersinia bacteria is the ability to not only survive, but also to actively proliferate at temperatures as low as 1–4 °C (e.g., on cut salads and other food products in a refrigerator). Yersinia bacteria are relatively quickly inactivated by oxidizing agents such as hydrogen peroxide and potassium permanganate solutions.

== Pathology ==
Y. pestis is the causative agent of plague. The disease caused by Y. enterocolitica is called yersiniosis.

Yersinia is implicated as one of the causes of reactive arthritis worldwide.

Also, the genus is associated with pseudoappendicitis, which is an incorrect diagnosis of appendicitis due to a similar presentation.

== Pathogenesis ==
=== Effector proteins ===
All pathogenic Yersinia have effector proteins that are injected into host cells using a type-three secretion system (T3SS), including 6 Yop proteins. Pathogenic Y. enterocolitica has a different effector protein family composed of 8 Ysp proteins. These effector proteins disrupt the cytoskeleton, phagocytosis, and various immune responses.

== History ==
Y. pestis, the first known species, was identified in 1894 by A.E.J. Yersin, a Swiss bacteriologist, and Kitasato Shibasaburō, a Japanese bacteriologist. It was formerly described as Pasteurella pestis (known trivially as the plague-bacillus) by Lehmann and Neumann in 1896. In 1944, van Loghem reclassified the species P. pestis and P. rondentium into a new genus, Yersinia. Following the introduction of the bacteriological code, it was accepted as valid in 1980.
