= Yersiniosis =

Human disease

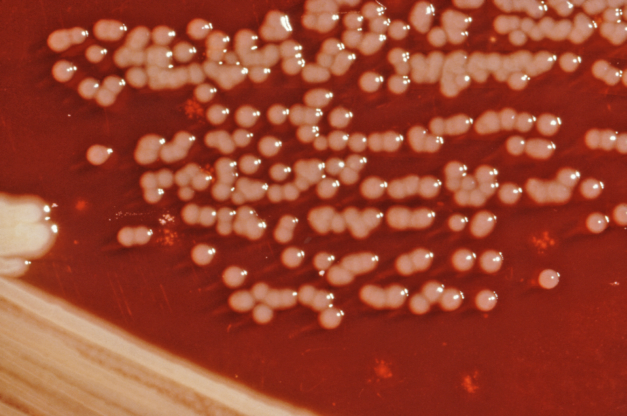
- Colonies of Y. enterocolitica growing on blood agar
- Specialty: Infectious disease, gastroenterology
- Symptoms: fever; bloody diarrhea; abdominal pain; vomiting
- Complications: Dehydration, hypovolemia; intestinal necrosis
- Duration: 1 to 3 weeks
- Causes: Y. enterocolitica (most cases); Y. pseudotuberculosis; other Yersinia species (rarely)
- Diagnostic method: ELISA; Bacterial culture
- Differential diagnosis: Appendicitis; food poisoning; viral enteritis; giardiasis; cholera; salmonellosis

Yersiniosis is an infectious disease of the gastrointestinal tract caused by bacteria of the genus Yersinia other than Y. pestis. Most cases of yersiniosis in humans are caused by Y. enterocolitica, with a small minority being caused by Y. pseudotuberculosis. Rarely, other species of the genus can cause yersiniosis.

While self-limiting in most healthy individuals, young children, the elderly, and immunocompromised patients often develop more severe infections. The bacteria is thought to be contracted through the consumption of undercooked meat products, mainly pork, unpasteurized milk, or contaminated water. It has been also sometimes associated with handling raw chitterlings. However, most cases of yersiniosis lack a clear source, and are considered sporadic.

Y. pestis is not considered to be a causative agent of yersiniosis because it is the organism that causes Plague, which is considered to be a distinct disease.

== Signs and symptoms ==
Infection with Y. enterocolitica can cause a variety of symptoms depending on the age of the person infected. Children less than 5 years of age tend to experience more severe symptoms. Common symptoms include:

- Fever
- Abdominal pain
- Diarrhea (typically bloody)
- Vomiting
- Weight loss

Symptoms typically develop 4 to 7 days after exposure and may last 1 to 3 weeks or longer. In older children and adults, right-sided abdominal pain and fever may be the predominant symptoms, and may be confused with appendicitis. In some cases, complications such as bowel perforation, toxic megacolon, peritonitis, and small bowel necrosis may occur. Some extra gastrointestinal manifestations such as skin rash, joint pains, ileitis, erythema nodosum, nephritis, myocarditis, and sometimes sepsis, acute arthritis or the spread of bacteria to the bloodstream (bacteremia) can also take place.

== Microbiology ==
Y. enterocolitica is an enteric gram negative organism belonging to the genus Yersinia which contains multiple strains of bacteria. The three most harmful to human beings are Y. enterocolitica, Y. Pestis, and Y. pseudotuberculosis. Y. enterocolitica is a facultative anaerobe which allows it at adapt to oxygen levels in its environment. Y. enterocolitica causes a pink color change on urea agar. It is able to ferment sorbitol and glucose, but it does not produce oxidase or metabolize lactose

=== Virulence ===
==== Plasmid ====
The most significant virulence marker of Y. enterocolitica is its plasmid pYV. This enables the bacteria to invade mucosal tissues as well as nearby mesenteric lymph nodes and other internal structures. Other virulence factors are encoded in the pYV plasmid. This includes Yersinia outer proteins (Yops), which enables the bacteria to adopt a type III secretion system (T3SS) in which a set of proteins are transported into the host cell cytosol where they inhibit phagocytosis and suppress the host immune response. The pYV plasmid also contains Yersinia adhesin A (YadA) previously knows as YopA. This protein binds different types of collagen and laminin, which is thought to contribute to complications of reactive arthritis. YadA also facilitates adhesion in order to propagate the infection. Lastly, Y. enterocolitica most significant regulatory gene is VirF. This gene acts as an activator for the transcription of other factors such as the Yops and YadA proteins.

==== Chromosome ====
Sone virulence factors are contained within the organisms chromosome. These include invasin (InvA), a polypeptide which allows the organism to directly bind integrins, facilitating its entry into host M cells. Y. enterocolitica contains an enterotoxin, Yst, which plays a crucial role in inducing diarrhea by activating guanylate cyclase and increasing the amount of cyclic guanosine monophosphate (cGMP) within intestinal cells. The presence of Yersinia modulator (YmoA) protein enables the organism to regulate the production of other virulence proteins. Mucoid yersinia factor (MyfA) is a protein through to facilitate adhesion and plays a critical role at the start of infection. Finally, the attachment invasion locus (Ali) is another protein that helps mediate attachment and provides resistance to immune components of the host organism.

=== Pathophysiology ===
Following ingestion of contaminated sources, Y. enterocolitica travels through the small intestine into the terminal ileum of the body, where it attaches to M cells. Using virulence proteins such as YadA, InvA and Ali the organism is able to attach and invade the cell. After penetration of the epithelium, Yersinia propagates within the Peyers patches. eventually spreading out to other organs within the region. Of note, Yersinia requires iron as a growth factor, however, its inability to chelate iron has allowed the bacteria to develop methods of obtaining it from its environment. As such, conditions such as hemochromatosis or patients with elevated levels of iron may experience a more severe course.

== Epidemiology ==
Y. enterocolitica is a pathogen most commonly found in pigs. The disease is transmitted amongst herds and may contaminate unexposed portions of the animal during slaughter. The most exposed tends to be areas of the head as well as the sternum.

When classifying Y. enterocolitica, it is notable that there are 6 bio groups and more than 70 O serogroups of the bacteria. The biotypes of Yersinia enterocolitica are categorized based on their pathogenicity. Biotype 1A is considered non pathogenic, 1B is highly virulent, while categories 2-5 are mildly pathogenic. Of the different O serotypes, O:3, O:5, O:8, O:9, and O:27 are considered pathogenic to humans. Previous outbreaks in the United States have been associated with serogroup O:8 with the mode of transmission identified as milk products on multiple occasions. There have also been numerous reports of sporadic infections in Europe linked with undercooked swine and contaminated drinking water. Similar instances have been reported in areas of China, India, and Australia. For most cases around the world over the last few years, the mode of transmission has remained unidentified.

== Transmission ==
The natural reservoir animals for Y. enterocolitica are swine, including domesticated pigs and wild boars. Y. enterocolitica has also been found in the digestive track of an array of different mammals. Some cases of Y. enterocolitica in humans have been associated with domestic animals such as cats or dogs. Y. Pseudotuberculosis is mainly found in rodents and is not often responsible for yersinosis in humans.

=== Foodborne transmission ===
Some animal hosts of Y. enterocolitica include pigs, cattle, rabbits, goats, and sheep. Most serotypes of the organism causing human infections are also present in pigs. As such, most cases of human yersiniosis are thought to be due to either consumption of undercooked pork. Other foods such as unpasteurized milk, vegetables, and poultry have also been associated with the spread of disease. Due to the frequency of associations between human and pig strains of yersiniosis, it is often referred to as a zoonotic disease.

=== Waterborne transmission ===
Outbreaks of Y. enterocolitica have also been associated with drinking contaminated water. Individuals residing in rural areas may obtain their water from the ground or rain water, which contains a higher risk of infection due to lack of regulation as well as contamination from animals or birds. As such, risk factors vary based on setting and access to clean sources of water.

== Diagnosis ==
Most diagnoses of yersiniosis are made via ELISA immunoassay testing. However, in locations without access to this form of testing, traditional bacterial cultures may be created and then biochemically tested. Stool culture is considered the most definitive test and may be positive within the first 2 weeks of infection. Biopsy of the mesenteric lymph nodes or terminal ileum may also be used for diagnosis. Of note, many cases of yersiniosis are initially misdiagnosed as appendicitis, which is much more common in the general population

=== Differential ===
Other considerations for similar patient presentations are:

- Acute Diarrhea
- Salmonella
- Campylobacter
- Shigella
- Diverticulitis
- Ischemic colitis
- Medication induced colitis
- Inflammatory bowel disease(IBD)

== Treatment ==
Treatment for gastroenteritis due to Y. enterocolitica typically requires only symptomatic treatment of diarrhea with common anti-diarrheal drugs. For severe infections with systemic involvement (sepsis or bacteremia), immunodeficiency, or elderly patients, prompt antibiotic therapy is often required; the drugs of choice are doxycycline and an aminoglycoside. Alternatives include cefotaxime, fluoroquinolones, and co-trimoxazole. Standard antibiotics such as penicillin are often ineffective due to the production of beta-lactamase enzymes by Yersinia species. Antimotility medications should not be used for patients with Yersinosis.

=== Prevention ===
Prevention of yersiniosis is primarily achieved through standard hygiene practices. These include proper preparation of meats such as pork by washing hands with soap and water prior to consuming or preparing the meal. It is also recommended to properly boil and cook pork to reduce risk of transmission. Furthermore, preventing rats and mice from contaminating food and water supplies is necessary. Other recommendations include avoiding consumption of raw or unpasteurized milk, proper washing of vegetables and fresh produce, as well as proper disposition of any animal feces.

== See also ==
- Plague
- Enteritis
- Appendicitis
