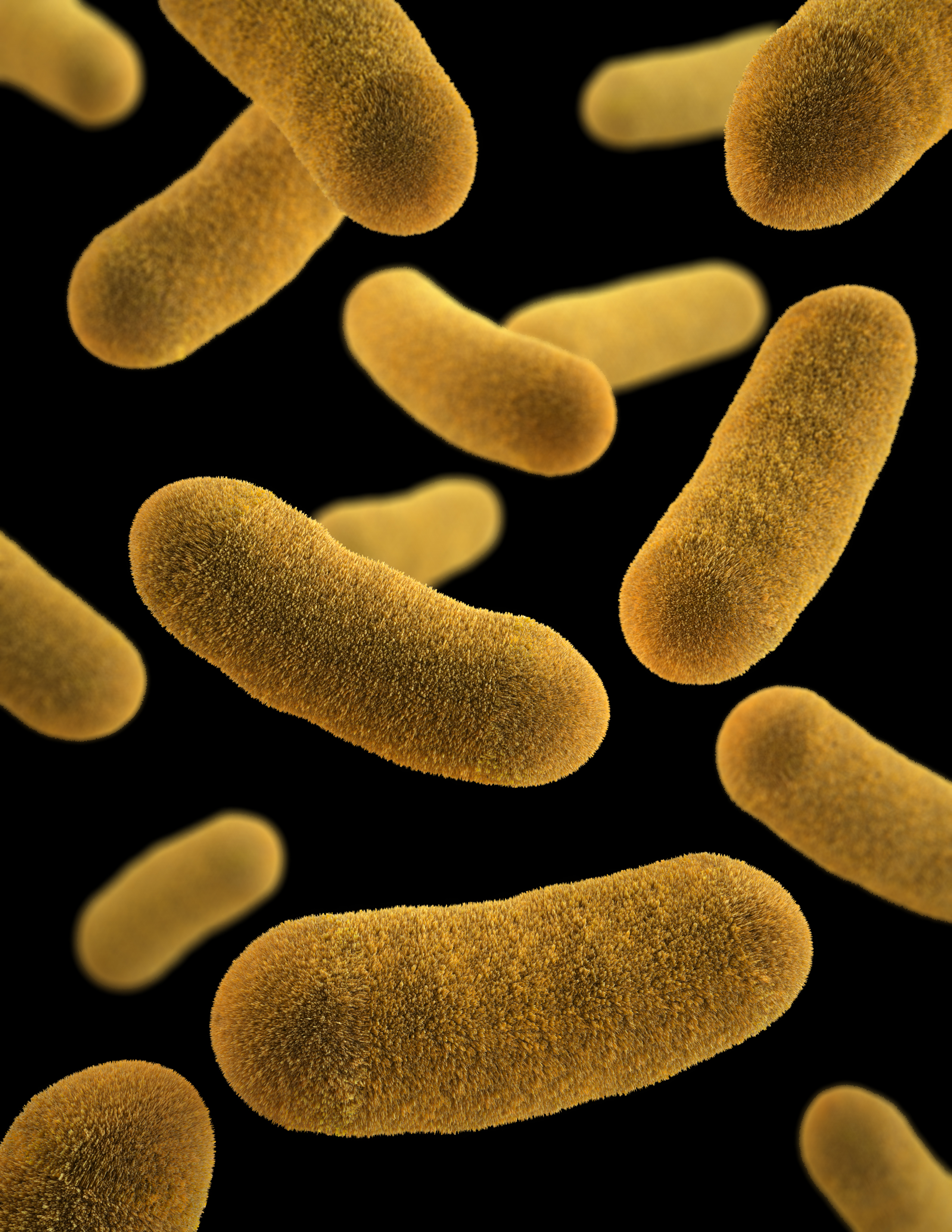

Scientific classification
- Domain: Bacteria
- Kingdom: Pseudomonadati
- Phylum: Pseudomonadota
- Class: Gammaproteobacteria
- Order: Enterobacterales
- Family: Yersiniaceae
- Genus: Yersinia
- Species: Y. enterocolitica

Binomial name
- Yersinia enterocolitica (Schleifstein & Coleman 1939)

Subspecies
- subsp. enterocolitica; subsp. palearctica

= Yersinia enterocolitica =

Species of bacterium

Yersinia enterocolitica is a Gram-negative, rod-shaped bacterium, belonging to the family Yersiniaceae. It is motile at temperatures of 22–29 °C (72–84 °F), but it becomes nonmotile at normal human body temperature. Y. enterocolitica infection causes the disease yersiniosis, which is an animal-borne disease occurring in humans, as well as in a wide array of animals such as cattle, deer, pigs, and birds. Many of these animals recover from the disease and become carriers; these are potential sources of contagion despite showing no signs of disease. The bacterium infects the host by sticking to its cells using trimeric autotransporter adhesins.

Y. enterocolitica is widespread in nature, occurring in reservoirs ranging from the intestinal tracts of numerous mammals, avian species, cold-blooded species, and even from terrestrial and aquatic niches. Most environmental isolates are avirulent; however, isolates recovered from porcine sources contain human pathogenic serogroups. In addition, dogs, sheep, wild rodents, and environmental water may also be a reservoir of pathogenic Y. enterocolitica strains. Human pathogenic strains are usually confined to the intestinal tract and lead to enteritis/diarrhea.

Within the genus Yersinia, only Y. pestis, Y. pseudotuberculosis, and certain strains of Y. enterocolitica are pathogenic for humans and certain animals. The other species are environmental in origin.

== Clinical identification ==
Y. enterocolitica strains can be identified through the use of stool samples being grown on MacConkey plates and Yersinia selective agar. The MacConkey plates employ the fact that Y. enterocolitica is non-lactose fermenting, and therefore show up on the plates as 2 mm translucent pale colonies. On Yersinia selective agar plates Y. enterocolitica produces 1.5 mm colonies with a dark pink center and translucent border.

Y. enterocolitica may be biotyped using biochemical tests into six biogroups and can be serotyped based on immunoreactivity to O antigen, a component of lipopolysaccharide, into over 57 O serogroups. At least four of the six biogroups (1B and 2–4) contain strains regarded as pathogens, and evidence suggests that some members of biogroup 1A may also have pathogenic potential. Strains that belong to serogroups O:3, O:5,27, O:8 and O:9 are the most common isolates from human samples. Strains from serogroups O:3 and O:9 may be the predominant pathogens in European countries, while serogroup O:8 is found in the United States, Japan and Europe.

== Modes of transmission ==
There have been six identified pathways of transmission of Yersinia enterocolitica.

1. Foodborne transmission: Yersinia enterocolitica has been isolated from various food items, including beef, oysters, fish, and chocolate milk, but the main food transmission is through exposure to undercooked or raw pork.
2. Human-to-human transmission: Although very rare, cases of human-to-human transmission of Yersinia enterocolitica via diarrheal disease has been isolated and reported.
3. Animal-to-human transmission: Yersinia enterocolitica has been reported to spread through indirect and direct contact with infected animals and their feces, most notably pigs.
4. Waterborne transmission: Yersinia enterocolitica is able to grow in cool aquatic environments, meaning that indirectly contaminated water can cause the spread of the bacterium.
5. Direct transmission: Although also very rare, there have been reported cases of direct inoculation of Yersinia enterocolitica resulting from traumatic punctures, suggesting environmental infection of Y. enterocolitica.
6. Blood transfusion: Y. enterocolitica can be transmitted through contaminated blood and can cause posttransfusion sepsis.

== Signs and symptoms ==
The portal of entry is the gastrointestinal tract. The organism is acquired usually by insufficiently cooked pork or contaminated water, meat, or milk. In recent years Y. enterocolitica has increasingly been causing smaller outbreaks via ready-to-eat (RTE) vegetables. Acute Y. enterocolitica infections usually lead to mild, self-limiting enterocolitis or terminal ileitis and adenitis in humans. Yersiniosis symptoms may include watery or bloody diarrhea and fever, resembling appendicitis, salmonellosis, or shigellosis. After oral uptake, Yersinia species replicate in the terminal ileum and invade Peyer's patches. From here, they can disseminate further to mesenteric lymph nodes causing lymphadenopathy. This condition can be confused with appendicitis, so is called pseudoappendicitis. In immunosuppressed individuals, they can disseminate from the gut to the liver and spleen and form abscesses. Because Yersinia species are siderophilic (iron-loving) bacteria, people with hereditary hemochromatosis (a disease resulting in high body iron levels) are more susceptible to infection with Yersinia (and other siderophilic bacteria). In fact, the most common contaminant of stored blood is Y. enterocolitica.

== Treatment ==
Yersiniosis is usually self-limiting and does not require treatment. For sepsis or severe focal infections, especially if associated with immunosuppression, the recommended regimen includes doxycycline in combination with an aminoglycoside. Other antibiotics active against Y. enterocolitica include trimethoprim-sulfamethoxasole, fluoroquinolones, ceftriaxone, and chloramphenicol. Y. enterocolitica is usually resistant to penicillin G, ampicillin, and cefalotin due to beta-lactamase production, but multidrug resistant strains have been reported in Europe.

== Prognosis ==
Y. enterocolitica infections are sometimes followed by chronic inflammatory diseases such as arthritis, erythema nodosum, and reactive arthritis. This is most likely because of some immune-mediated mechanism.

Y. enterocolitica seems to be associated with autoimmune Graves–Basedow thyroiditis. Although indirect evidence exists, direct causative evidence is limited. Y. enterocolitica is probably not a major cause of this disease, but it may contribute to the development of thyroid autoimmunity arising for other reasons in genetically susceptible individuals. Y. enterocolitica infection has also been suggested to not be the cause of autoimmune thyroid disease, but rather an associated condition, with both sharing a common inherited susceptibility. More recently, the role of Y. enterocolitica has been disputed.
