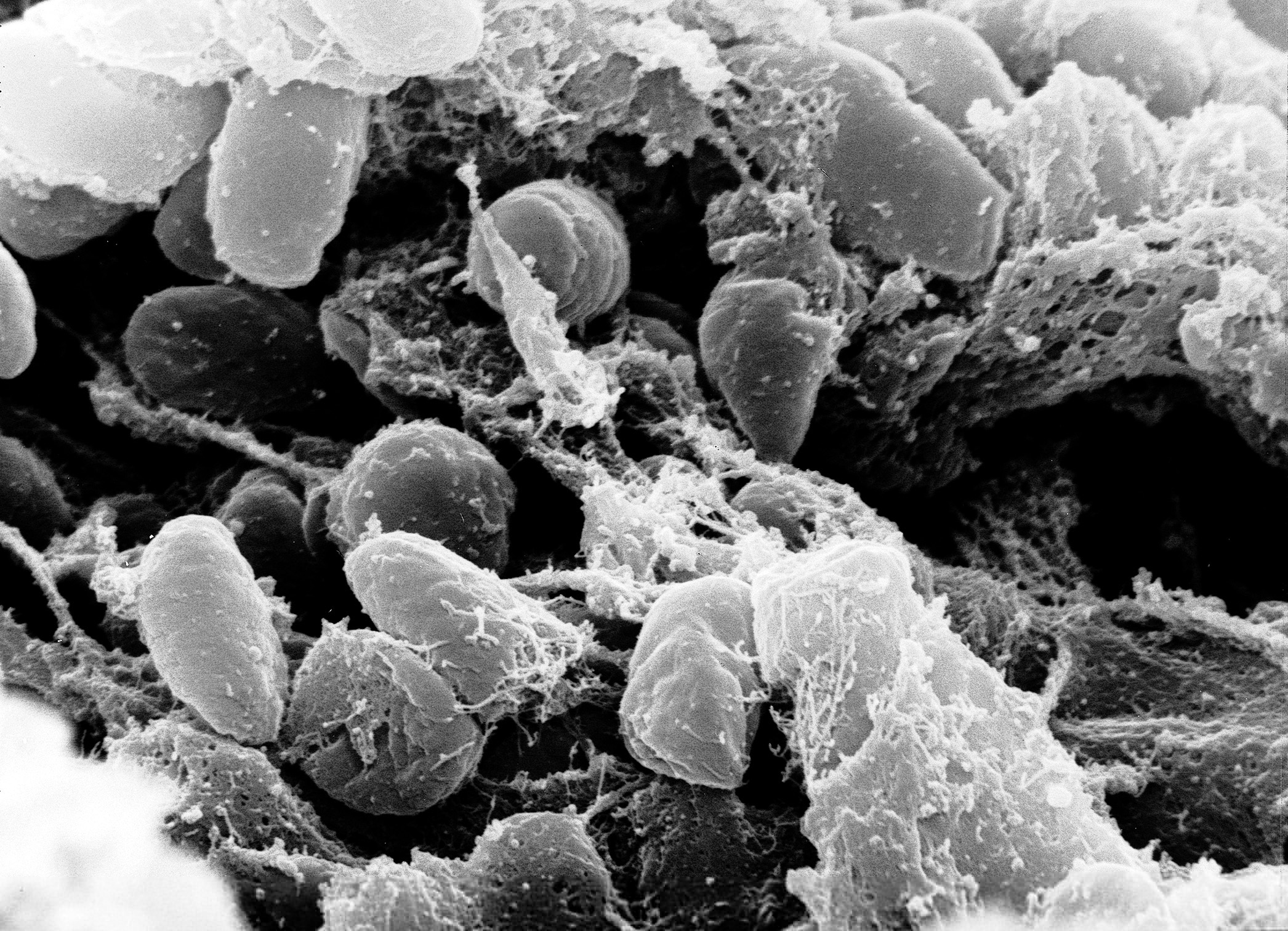
- Yersinia pestis

Scientific classification
- Domain: Bacteria
- Kingdom: Pseudomonadati
- Phylum: Pseudomonadota
- Class: Gammaproteobacteria
- Order: Enterobacterales
- Family: Yersiniaceae; Adeolu et al., 2016

Genera
- Chania; Chimaeribacter; Ewingella; Rahnella; Rouxiella; Samsonia; Serratia; Yersinia; "Ca. Fukatsuia"

= Yersiniaceae =

Family of bacteria

The Yersiniaceae are a family of Gram-negative bacteria that includes some familiar pathogens. For example, the type genus Yersinia includes Yersinia pestis, the causative agent of plague. This family is a member of the order Enterobacterales in the class Gammaproteobacteria of the phylum Pseudomonadota.

The name Yersiniaceae is derived from the Latin term Yersinia, referring the type genus of the family and the suffix "-aceae", an ending used to denote a family. Together, Yersiniaceae refers to a family whose nomenclatural type is the genus Yersinia.

== Biochemical characteristics and molecular signatures ==
These bacteria are motile, catalase-positive, and do not produce hydrogen disulfide.

Analyses of genome sequences from Yersiniaceae species identified three conserved signature indels (CSIs) that are uniquely present in this family in the proteins TetR family transcriptional regulator and a hypothetical protein. These CSIs provide a reliable molecular method for distinguishing members of this family from other families within the order Enterobacterales and all other bacteria.

== Historical systematics and current taxonomy ==
Yersiniaceae, as of 2021, contains eight validly published genera. Members of this family were originally members of the family Enterobacteriaceae, a large phylogenetically unrelated group of species with distinct biochemical characteristics and different ecological niches. The original assignment of species into the family Enterobacteriaceae was largely based on 16S rRNA genome sequence analyses, which is known to have low discriminatory power and the results of which changes depends on the algorithm and organism information used. Despite this, the analyses still exhibited polyphyletic branching, indicating the presence of distinct subgroups within the family.

In 2016, Adeolu et al. proposed the division of Enterobacteriaceae into 7 novel families based on comparative genomic analyses and the branching pattern of various phylogenetic trees constructed from conserved genome sequences, 16S rRNA sequences and multilocus sequence analyses. Molecular markers, specifically conserved signature indels, specific to this family were also identified as evidence supporting the division independent of phylogenetic trees.
