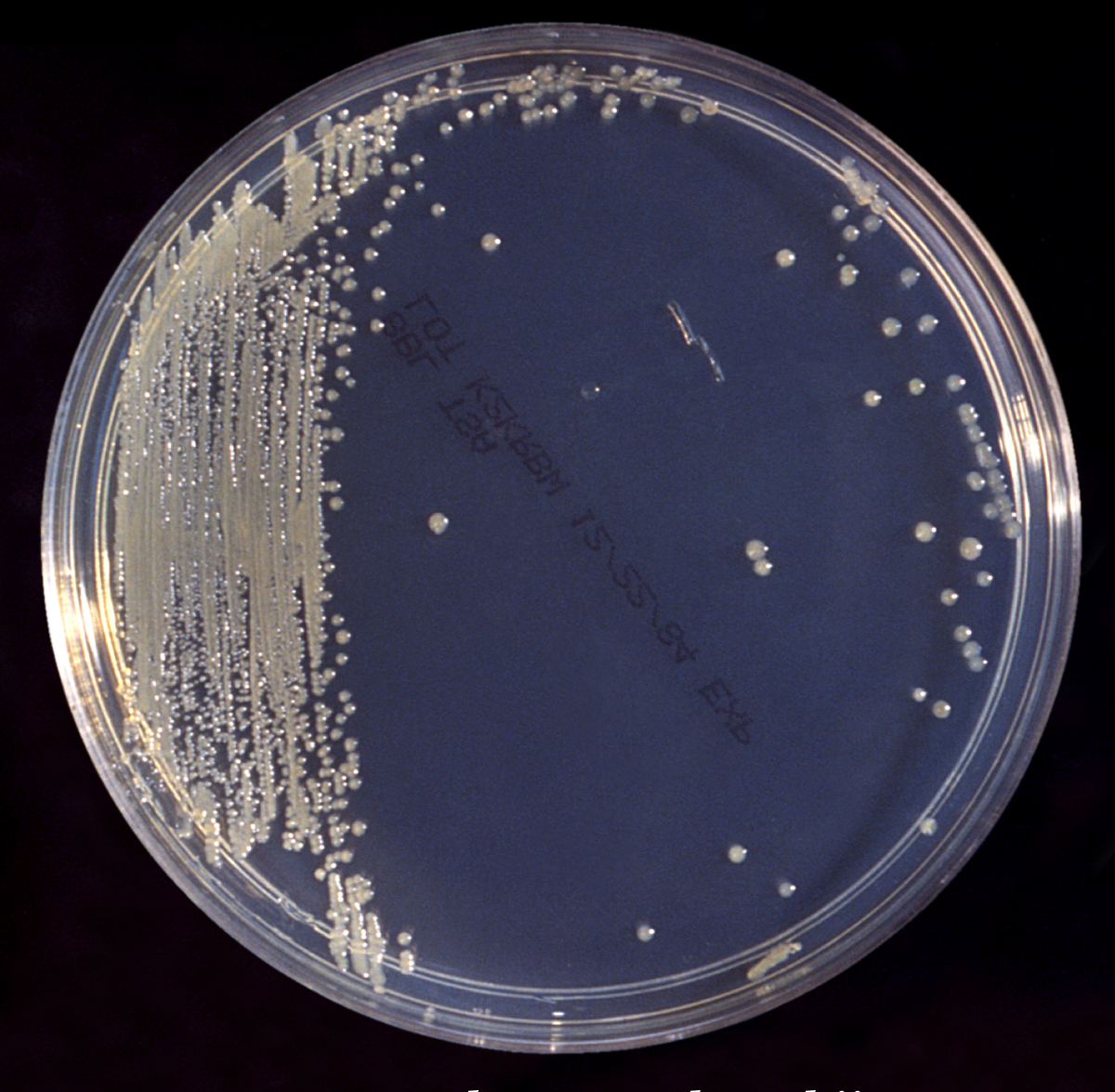
- Colonies on trypticase soy broth agar

Scientific classification
- Domain: Bacteria
- Kingdom: Pseudomonadati
- Phylum: Pseudomonadota
- Class: Gammaproteobacteria
- Order: Enterobacterales
- Family: Enterobacteriaceae
- Genus: Cronobacter
- Species: C. sakazakii

Binomial name
- Cronobacter sakazakii (Farmer et al. 1980)

= Cronobacter sakazakii =

Species of bacterium

Cronobacter sakazakii, which before 2007 was named Enterobacter sakazakii, is an opportunistic Gram-negative, rod-shaped, pathogenic bacterium that can live in very dry places, a phenomenon known as xerotolerance. C. sakazakii utilizes a number of genes to survive desiccation and this xerotolerance may be strain specific. Most C. sakazakii cases are adults but low-birth-weight preterm neonates and older infants are at the highest risk. The pathogen is a rare cause of invasive infection in infants, with historically high case fatality rates (40–80%).

All Cronobacter species, except C. condimenti, have been linked retrospectively to clinical cases of infection in either adults or infants. However multilocus sequence typing has shown that most neonatal meningitis cases in the past 30 years, across six countries, have been associated with only one genetic lineage of the species Cronobacter sakazakii called 'Sequence Type 4' or 'ST4', and therefore this clone appears to be of greatest concern with infant infections.

The bacterium is ubiquitous, being isolated from a range of environments and foods; the majority of Cronobacter cases occur in the adult population. However it is the association with intrinsically or extrinsically contaminated powdered formula which has attracted the main attention. According to multilocus sequence analysis (MLSA) the genus originated ~40 MYA, and the most clinically significant species, C. sakazakii, was distinguishable ~15-23 MYA.

== Taxonomy ==
E. sakazakii was defined as a species in 1980 by JJ Farmer III et al. DNA–DNA hybridization showed that E. sakazakii was 53–54% related to species in two different genera, Enterobacter and Citrobacter. However, diverse biogroups within E. sakazakii were described and Farmer et al suggested these may represent different species and required further research for clarification.

The taxonomic relationship between E. sakazakii strains has been studied using full-length 16S rRNA gene sequencing, DNA–DNA hybridization, multilocus sequence typing (MLST), f-AFLP, automated ribotyping. This resulted in the classification of E. sakazakii as a new genus, Cronobacter within the Enterobacteriaceae, initially comprising four named species in 2007. The taxonomy was expanded to five named species in 2008, and more recently (2011) to seven named species.

The initial four named species in 2007 were Cronobacter sakazakii (comprising two subspecies), C. turicensis, C. muytjensii and C. dublinensis (comprising three subspecies) plus an unnamed species referred to as Cronobacter genomospecies I. The taxonomy was revised in 2008 to include a fifth named species C. malonaticus, which in 2007 had been regarded as a subspecies of C. sakazakii. In 2012, Cronobacter genomospecies I was formally renamed Cronobacter universalis, and a seventh species was described called Cronobacter condimenti.

== Etymology ==
The first documented isolation of what would become known as Cronobacter sakazakii was from a can of dried milk in 1950, although these organisms have likely existed for millions of years. In 1980, John J. Farmer III, proposed the name Enterobacter sakazakii for what had been known as "yellow-pigmented E. cloacae", in honor of Japanese bacteriologist Riichi Sakazaki. Over the next decades, E. sakazakii was implicated in scores of cases of meningitis and sepsis among infants, frequently in association with powdered infant formula. In 2007, the genus Cronobacter was created to accommodate the biogroups of E. sakazakii, with C. sakazakii as the type species. The genus was named for Cronos, the Titan of Greek myth, who devoured his children as they were born.

== Identification ==
Similar to other Enterobactericiae, C. sakazakii is oxidase negative, motile, and catalase positive. The bacterium produces a yellow pigment that is enhanced by incubation at 20 °C. C. sakazakii can be differentiated from Enterobacter spp through positive Vogues-Proskauer, arginine dihydrolase, and ornithine decarboxylase reactions.

== Pathogenesis ==
In infants C. sakazakii can cause bacteraemia, meningitis and necrotizing enterocolitis. Most neonatal C. sakazakii infections cases have been associated with the use of powdered infant formula with some strains able to survive in a desiccated state for more than two years. However, not all cases have been linked to contaminated infant formula. In November 2011, several shipments of Kotex tampons were recalled due to a Cronobacter (E. sakazakii) contamination. In one study, the pathogen was found in 12% of field vegetables and 13% of hydroponic vegetables.

== Treatment ==
Cronobacter sakazakii is intrinsically resistant to ampicillin and first- and second- generation cephalosporins due to production of an inducible AmpC β-lactamase.
