= Pluralibacter pyrinus =

Scientific classification
- Domain: Bacteria
- Kingdom: Pseudomonadati
- Phylum: Pseudomonadota
- Class: Gammaproteobacteria
- Order: Enterobacterales
- Family: Enterobacteriaceae
- Genus: Pluralibacter
- Species: P. pyrinus

Binomial name
- Pluralibacter pyrinus (Chung et al. 1993) Brady et al. 2013

Synonyms
- Enterobacter pyrinus Erwinia pirina

Species of bacterium

Pluralibacter pyrinus (formerly Enterobacter pyrinus) is a Gram-negative, motile, facultatively-anaerobic, rod-shaped bacterium. P. pyrinus is the causitive agent of brown leaf spot disease of pear trees.

== Background ==
The cause of brown leaf spot disease affecting pear trees in South Korea was first identified as a novel bacterial infection in 1990. The proposed name for the species was Erwinia pirina, but this name was not validly published. In 1993, further research grouped the organism in the genus Enterobacter as E. pyrinus. Later studies of the genus Enterobacter lead to the species being reclassified into the novel genus Pluralibacter in 2013. The species name is derived from the Greek word pŷr, which means pear.
