= Pluralibacter gergoviae =

Scientific classification
- Domain: Bacteria
- Kingdom: Pseudomonadati
- Phylum: Pseudomonadota
- Class: Gammaproteobacteria
- Order: Enterobacterales
- Family: Enterobacteriaceae
- Genus: Pluralibacter
- Species: P. gergoviae

Binomial name
- Pluralibacter gergoviae Brenner et al. 1980; Brady et al. 2013

Synonyms
- Enterobacter gergoviae

Species of bacterium

Pluralibacter gergoviae (formerly Enterobacter gergoviae) is a Gram-negative, motile, facultatively-anaerobic, rod-shaped bacterium. P. gergoviae is of special interest to the cosmetics industry, as it displays resistance to parabens, a common antimicrobial agent added to cosmetic products.

P. gergoviae can be an opportunistic human pathogen, primarily affecting immunocompromised patients.

== Background ==
Enterobacter gergoviae was first proposed as a novel species in 1980. The species name is derived from the Gergovie plateau, which is located near Clermont-Ferrand University Hospital; the type strain was isolated at this hospital during a nosocomial outbreak of P. gergoviae. In 2013, the species was reclassified into the novel genus, Pluralibacter, and is the type species for the genus.

Pluralibacter gergoviae has been isolated from maize, grapes, coffee beans, spring water, fruit flies, and pink bollworms.

== Microbiology ==
Pluralibacter gergoviae is a Gram negative, non-spore forming, motile, facultatively anaerobic bacillus. It is non-hemolytic and grows at mesophilic temperatures, from 10 - 41°C, with optimum growth at 30 - 37°C. It can produce urease and acetoin, and is hydrogen sulfide, cytochrome c oxidase, and indole negative. Additionally, it does not ferment inositol, d-sorbitol, and mucate, which distinguishes it from Klebsiella aerogenes (previously Enterobacter aerogenes).

Pluralibacter gergoviae can be grown on trypticase soy agar and Columbia blood agar. However, it does not grow in potassium cyanide broth. Colonies are typically unpigmented, round, and smooth on tryptic soy agar.

== Medical Relevance ==
Pluralibacter gergoviae is an uncommon human pathogen and is most commonly an opportunistic nosocomial infection. One hospital in Spain reported the organism to represent 0.4% of clinical Enterobacter isolates. Risk factors include prolonged hospital stays, immunosuppression, the presence of a foreign device, prior use of anti-microbial agents in the patient involved, and extremes of age. In the cosmetic industry, P. gergoviae has been implicated in recalls of eye cream, children's shampoo, skin cream, hand cleaning paste, and cleansing wipes.

Infections caused by this organism are most frequent in transplant recipients, patients with hematologic malignancies, and in neonatal outbreak settings. Additionally, there has been a report of hyperammonemia syndrome in an immunocompromised lung transplant patient due to P. gergoviae, believed to be triggered by urease production.

When P. gergoviae infection becomes established, it can be difficult to treat due to its intrinsic resistance to many antibiotics. It is resistant to penicillins (specifically benzylpenicillin, oxacillin), macrolides (with the exception of azithromycin), lincosamides (specifically lincomycin and clindamycin), streptogramins, rifampicin, fusidic acid, and fosfomycin. P. gergoviae is also resistant to cefoxitin, likely due to β-lactamase production. In a systematic review of case studies, it was found that 33% of the isolates were multi drug resistant, and all fatal cases involved isolates carrying the bla_{KPC} gene.
