= Buttiauxella agrestis =

Scientific classification
- Domain: Bacteria
- Kingdom: Pseudomonadati
- Phylum: Pseudomonadota
- Class: Gammaproteobacteria
- Order: Enterobacterales
- Family: Enterobacteriaceae
- Genus: Buttiauxella
- Species: B. agrestis

Binomial name
- Buttiauxella agrestis Ferragut et al. 1982

Type strain
- ATCC 33320, BCRC 12221, CCRC 12221, CCUG 11756, CDC 1176-81, CIP 80-31, CIP 80.31, CIP 80.31T, CL 644/80, CNCTC 6263, CNCTC Eb 8/82, CUETM 77-163, CUETM 77-167, CUETM 77.167, DSM 4586, F-44, Gavini F-44, JCM 1090, Kosako 536, LMG 7861, NCTC 12119, Sakazaki 536

Species of bacterium

Buttiauxella agrestis is a bacterium from the genus Buttiauxella which has been isolated from soil. Buttiauxella agrestis can cause surgical site infections
