= Buttiauxella gaviniae =

Scientific classification
- Domain: Bacteria
- Kingdom: Pseudomonadati
- Phylum: Pseudomonadota
- Class: Gammaproteobacteria
- Order: Enterobacterales
- Family: Enterobacteriaceae
- Genus: Buttiauxella
- Species: B. gaviniae

Binomial name
- Buttiauxella gaviniae Müller et al. 1996

Type strain
- ATCC 51604, CCM 4875, CCUG 35508, CDC 9509-94, CIP 106356, DSM 9393, S1/1-984, serial n° 062

Species of bacterium

Buttiauxella gaviniae is a bacterium from the genus Buttiauxella which has been isolated from a snail in Braunschweig in Germany.

Buttiauxella gaviniae is named after the French microbiologist Françoise Gavini.
