= Buttiauxella brennerae =

Scientific classification
- Domain: Bacteria
- Kingdom: Pseudomonadati
- Phylum: Pseudomonadota
- Class: Gammaproteobacteria
- Order: Enterobacterales
- Family: Enterobacteriaceae
- Genus: Buttiauxella
- Species: B. brennerae

Binomial name
- Buttiauxella brennerae Müller et al. 1996

Type strain
- ATCC 51605, CCM 4876, CCUG 35509, CDC 9510-94, CIP 106477, DSM 9396, S1/6-571, serial, serial n° 145

Species of bacterium

Buttiauxella brennerae is a bacterium from the genus Buttiauxella which has been isolated from a snail in Braunschweig in Germany.Buttiauxella brennerae is named after the American microbiologist W. Hickmann-Brenner.
