= Enteric bacteria (disambiguation) =

Enteric bacteria are bacteria of the intestines, and may refer to:

- Gut flora, which are always present and usually harmless
- Pathogenic bacteria of bacterial gastroenteritis
- The taxonomic family Enterobacteriaceae
- The taxonomic order Enterobacterales
