= Shimwellia blattae =

Scientific classification
- Domain: Bacteria
- Kingdom: Pseudomonadati
- Phylum: Pseudomonadota
- Class: Gammaproteobacteria
- Order: Enterobacterales
- Family: Enterobacteriaceae
- Genus: Shimwellia
- Species: S. blattae

Binomial name
- Shimwellia blattae (Burgess et al. 1973) Priest and Barker 2010, comb. nov.

Synonyms
- Escherichia blattae Burgess 1973

Species of bacterium

Shimwellia blattae (formerly Escherichia blattae) is a species of Gram-negative bacterium, one of two in the genus Shimwellia. It is an aerobic enteric bacterium first isolated from the hindgut of cockroaches. Although it is related to human pathogens, including Escherichia coli, S. blattae is not pathogenic to humans. It is notable for its ability to synthesize vitamin B12 de novo.

== History and taxonomy ==
The bacterium was first described in 1973 under the name Escherichia blattae after isolation from the hindgut of the cockroach species Blatta orientalis. It was reclassified to the genus Shimwellia based on phylogenetic analyses of its genome sequence.

== Genome ==
The genome of S. blattae is about 4.2 megabases in size, slightly smaller than similar enteric bacteria found in humans. It has 56.5% GC content, significantly higher than E. coli. Genomic analysis suggests that the ability of S. blattae to synthesize vitamin B12 has its origins in horizontal gene transfer.
