= Buttiauxella noackiae =

Scientific classification
- Domain: Bacteria
- Kingdom: Pseudomonadati
- Phylum: Pseudomonadota
- Class: Gammaproteobacteria
- Order: Enterobacterales
- Family: Enterobacteriaceae
- Genus: Buttiauxella
- Species: B. noackiae

Binomial name
- Buttiauxella noackiae Müller et al. 1996

Type strain
- ATCC 51607, CCM 4864, CCUG 35511, CDC 9512-94, CIP 106358, DSM 9401, EG 59-like NSW 11, NSW 11, serial n° 170

Species of bacterium

Buttiauxella noackiae is a Gram-negative bacterium from the genus Buttiauxella which has been isolated from a snail in Sydney in Australia. Buttiauxella noackiae is named after Katrin Noack.
