= Buttiauxella ferragutiae =

Scientific classification
- Domain: Bacteria
- Kingdom: Pseudomonadati
- Phylum: Pseudomonadota
- Class: Gammaproteobacteria
- Order: Enterobacterales
- Family: Enterobacteriaceae
- Genus: Buttiauxella
- Species: B. ferragutiae

Binomial name
- Buttiauxella ferragutiae Müller et al. 1996

Type strain
- ATCC 51602, CCM 4874, CCUG 35507, CDC 1180-81, CDC 1180A-81, CIP 106355, CUETM 78-31, DSM 9390, serial, serial n° 054

Species of bacterium

Buttiauxella ferragutiae is a bacterium from the genus Buttiauxella which has been isolated from soil in France.
