= Buttiauxella warmboldiae =

Scientific classification
- Domain: Bacteria
- Kingdom: Pseudomonadati
- Phylum: Pseudomonadota
- Class: Gammaproteobacteria
- Order: Enterobacterales
- Family: Enterobacteriaceae
- Genus: Buttiauxella
- Species: B. warmboldiae

Binomial name
- Buttiauxella warmboldiae Müller et al. 1996

Type strain
- ATCC 51608, CCM 4878, CCUG 35512, CDC 9513-94, CIP 106359, DSM 9404, EG 59-like NSW 326, NSW 326, serial n° 182

Species of bacterium

Buttiauxella warmboldiae is a bacterium from the genus Buttiauxella which has been isolated from a snail in Sydney in Australia. Buttiauxella warmboldiae is named after Sabine Warmbold.
