= Cedecea davisae =

Scientific classification
- Domain: Bacteria
- Kingdom: Pseudomonadati
- Phylum: Pseudomonadota
- Class: Gammaproteobacteria
- Order: Enterobacterales
- Family: Enterobacteriaceae
- Genus: Cedecea
- Species: C. davisae

Binomial name
- Cedecea davisae Grimont et al. 1981

Species of bacterium

Cedecea davisae is a gram-negative, motile, rod-shaped, non-sporulating, lipase-positive bacteria.

== Phylogeny and genome evolution ==
The bacteria falls into the genus Cedecae, which was discovered by the Centers for Disease Control and Prevention in 1977 and determined to be its own genus in 1981. There are five different species within the genus Cadecea: C. davisae, C. lapangei, C. netri, Cedecea spp. 3, and Cedecea spp. 5. The classification of this organism from Kingdom to species is Bacteria, Proteobacteria, Gammaproteobacteria, Enterobacterales, Cedecea, davisae. It is described as an emerging pathogen, due to it being discovered fairly recently.

== Metabolic details ==
Cedecea davisae is a part of the Enterobacteriaceae family. This family is well known for being chemoorganoheterotrophs and therefore it is safe to assume that Cedecea davisae is most likely a Chemoorganoheterotroph, meaning it gets its energy and carbon from other sources than itself, although research has not clearly stated this.

== Relevance to human health ==
Cedecea davisae is an opportunistic pathogen, meaning its presence will only cause an infection to its host in the right circumstances. Such conditions can include advanced age, renal disease, cystic fibrosis as well as other comorbidities. When Cedecea davisae is provided with any of these optimal conditions, it can play an important role in a variety of bacterial infections that can take place in the human body.

With the antibiotic resistance Cedecea davisae has acquired, it can be difficult to treat such rare infections.
