= ByHeart =

American infant formula company

- Company type: Private
- Founded: 2016
- Founders: Mia Funt; Ron Belldegrun
- Headquarters: New York City, United States
- Products: Infant formula
- Website: byheart.com

ByHeart is an American infant formula company. It was founded in 2016 by Mia Funt and Ron Belldegrun, and headquartered in New York City. Its first infant formula was launched in March 2022. ByHeart's products have been associated with two incidents of bacterial contamination since being launched, the first contamination with Cronobacter sakazakii in 2022, the second a national outbreak of Clostridium botulinum which sickened 37 infants with botulism in November 2025.

== History ==
ByHeart was founded in 2016 by siblings Mia Funt and Ron Belldegrun. Their goal was to create an infant formula modeled more closely after breast milk, built on recent nutritional research. In 2019, ByHeart acquired a production facility in Reading, Pennsylvania. It became one of the few U.S. formula companies with end-to-end manufacturing capabilities.

In June 2021, ByHeart became the first U.S. infant formula to receive the Clean Label Project Purity Award, which screens products for more than 500 potential contaminants, including heavy metals and pesticides.

ByHeart launched its first infant formula in March 2022. At the time, the U.S. was facing an infant formula shortage. The company became the first new FDA-registered U.S. infant formula manufacturer in more than 15 years.

In January 2023, ByHeart acquired Cascadia Nutrition, an FDA-registered blending and packaging facility in Oregon and later purchased a plant in Allerton, Iowa.

ByHeart's infant formula became available in more than 1,000 Target stores in August 2023. In early 2024, it became available in more than 1,100 Walmart stores and subsequently entered Whole Foods Market and Wegmans. In May 2024, ByHeart became available in Publix locations across the United States. ByHeart's infant formulas also became available in Walmart, Whole Foods Market, and Wegmans by October 2024.

In December 2024, Denice Torres, former president of McNeil Consumer Healthcare at Johnson & Johnson, was appointed to the board of directors.

ByHeart launched the "Anywhere Pack", a portable pack for infant feeding, in May 2025.

== Botulism outbreak ==
In November 2025, ByHeart initiated a voluntary recall of two batches of infant formula after 13 infants were hospitalized with botulism having consumed the product. Whilst ByHeart initially said the FDA had not detected toxins or any linkage with their product, the California Department of Public Health later confirmed their products had tested positive for Clostridium botulinum type A spore contamination. ByHeart's founders released a statement confirming the positive test, but claimed testing a previously opened product "lacks scientific basis to establish causation". The California Department of Public Health urged parents to stop feeding infants ByHeart formula. On November 11 in response to 2 further cases, ByHeart initiated a nationwide recall of their products. Subsequently, testing by a third party commissioned by ByHeart revealed the presence of Clostridium botulinum in unopened containers of infant formula.

As of November 14, 2025, 23 infants with suspected or confirmed infant botulism and confirmed exposure to ByHeart Whole Nutrition infant formula (various lots) had been reported from 13 states. By November 19th, those cases had risen to 31 in 15 states. Parents of babies sickened by ByHeart infant formula filed lawsuits against the company.

== Ingredients ==
ByHeart's Whole Nutrition Infant Formula is made with a patented protein blend designed to resemble human breast milk. It has lactoferrin, alpha-lactalbumin, an 80:20 whey-to-casein ratio similar to colostrum, lactose as the sole carbohydrate, partially hydrolyzed proteins, organic prebiotics, and the fatty acids DHA and ARA. The formula excludes corn syrup, gluten, GMOs, maltodextrin, soy, hexane-extracted DHA, artificial growth hormones, and palm oil.

== Clinical trials ==
In 2022, ByHeart completed a company-funded randomized controlled trial evaluating its infant formula enrolling over 300 infants. The results were published in the Journal of Pediatric Gastroenterology and Nutrition, which found the formula to be non-inferior to a commercial control in supporting infant growth. The study also reported outcomes suggesting improved gastrointestinal tolerance.

== Regulatory oversight ==
In December 2022, ByHeart voluntarily recalled five batches of its infant formula due to possible Cronobacter contamination, although no illnesses were reported.

Between December 2022 and February 2023, the FDA inspected ByHeart's Reading, Pennsylvania facility along with those of Mead Johnson Nutrition (Reckitt) and Perrigo Wisconsin, LLC, and subsequently issued warning letters citing violations of infant formula regulations. The warning letter referenced the February 2023 inspection, and Byheart submitted multiple corrective action plans in response.

The FDA stated that ByHeart had addressed its observations and did "not advise parents and caregivers to discard or avoid purchasing any particular infant formula". The company does not currently have any open questions from the FDA regarding the observations in the warning letter. Following the inspection, ByHeart acquired two new facilities to ensure they meet and exceed quality regulations.
