= Buttiauxella izardii =

Scientific classification
- Domain: Bacteria
- Kingdom: Pseudomonadati
- Phylum: Pseudomonadota
- Class: Gammaproteobacteria
- Order: Enterobacterales
- Family: Enterobacteriaceae
- Genus: Buttiauxella
- Species: B. izardii

Binomial name
- Buttiauxella izardii Müller et al. 1996

Type strain
- ATCC 51606, CCM 4877, CCUG 35510, CDC 9511-94, CIP 106357, DSM 9397, S3/2-161, serial n° 151

Species of bacterium

Buttiauxella izardii is a bacterium from the genus Buttiauxella which has been isolated from a snail in Braunschweig in Germany. Buttiauxella izardii is named after the French microbiologist Daniel Izard.
