= Enterobacter cancerogenus =

Scientific classification
- Domain: Bacteria
- Kingdom: Pseudomonadati
- Phylum: Pseudomonadota
- Class: Gammaproteobacteria
- Order: Enterobacterales
- Family: Enterobacteriaceae
- Genus: Enterobacter
- Species: E. cancerogenus

Binomial name
- Enterobacter cancerogenus (Urosevic 1966) Dickey and Zumoff 1988

Species of bacterium

Enterobacter cancerogenus is a species of Gram-negative bacteria formerly known as Enteric Group 19. Strains of E. cancerogenus are positive for: Voges-Proskauer, citrate utilization, arginine dihydrolase and malonate utilization. They ferment D-glucose and also ferment D-mannitol, L-rhamnose and cellobiose. They are negative for indole production, urea hydrolysis, lysine decarboxylase and fermentation of adonitol, D-sorbitol and raffinose. It occurs in human clinical specimens, being isolated from blood and from spinal fluid. It is known to cause infections and is not susceptible to penicillins nor cephalosporins.
