= Kosakonia cowanii =

Scientific classification
- Domain: Bacteria
- Kingdom: Pseudomonadati
- Phylum: Pseudomonadota
- Class: Gammaproteobacteria
- Order: Enterobacterales
- Family: Enterobacteriaceae
- Genus: Kosakonia
- Species: K. cowanii

Binomial name
- Kosakonia cowanii Inoue et al. 2001

Species of bacterium

Kosakonia cowanii is a Gram-negative, motile, facultatively-anaerobic, rod-shaped species in the genus Kosakonia. The species is typically associated with natural environments and is found in soil, water, and sewage. K. cowanii is associated with plant pathogens that exhibit symptoms of severe defoliation and plant death. This species, originally referred to as NIH Group 42, was first proposed in 2000 as a potential member of the family Enterobacteriaceae. The name of this species honors S. T. Cowan, an English bacteriologist, for his significant contributions to the field of bacterial taxonomy.

== Phenotypic characterization ==
Kosakonia cowanii is phenotypically defined as being a Gram-negative, motile, and facultative anaerobic bacterium. The morphology of this bacterium is described as being cream colored when cultured on non-selective, YDC (Yeast extract-dextrose-CaCO_{3}) medium. When tested for enzyme production, K. cowanii is asparagine and catalase positive, while also being urease and oxidase negative. When originally introduced as NIH Group 42, seventy traditional phenotypic characteristics were determined and listed by Kohaku et al.

== Genotypic characterization ==
The diversity of strains present in the Kosakonia cowanii species have been confirmed through analysis of DNA G+C content and DNA-DNA Hybridization results, which involves the hybridizing (annealing) of putative strains to K. cowanii LMG 23569T. A DNA similarity of 70% or greater indicates that strains of interest are the same species. When testing for DNA-DNA similarity comparing the rpoB gene of K. cowanii, the strains BCC 009, BCC 011, BCC 078 showed 76% to 92% DNA similarity.

N.B. Using a multilocus sequence analysis (MLSA) approach, based on partial sequencing of protein-encoding genes (gyrB, rpoB, infB and atpD), this species was reclassified to the genus Kosakonia, so that its name is more properly given as Kosakonia cowanii.

== Microbiology ==
Isolates of Kosakonia cowanii were extracted from leaf tissue of the Eucalyptus trees. To determine the overall relatedness of the isolated strains, 16S rRNA gene sequencing was utilized. The 16S rRNA gene is commonly implemented for sequencing and inferring relatedness of isolates, because it is highly conserved. Phylogenetically related strains of K. cowanii, determined through 16S rRNA gene sequencing and rpoB gene sequencing, include BCC 078, BCC 074, BCC 008, BCC 011 and BCC 009.

== Diversity ==
When comparing the DNA from a representative strain of NIH Group 42 and DNA from 35 other species of Enterobacteriaceae by DNA-DNA hybridization, it was found that the degree of reassociation ranged from 5–38% at 70 °C. Because of its unique phenotypic characteristics and its distinct separation from other species of Enterobacteriaceae by DNA hybridization, there is sufficient evidence that constitutes K. cowanii a separate species in the family Enterobacteriaceae.
