= Cronobacter malonaticus =

Scientific classification
- Domain: Bacteria
- Kingdom: Pseudomonadati
- Phylum: Pseudomonadota
- Class: Gammaproteobacteria
- Order: Enterobacterales
- Family: Enterobacteriaceae
- Genus: Cronobacter
- Species: C. malonaticus

Binomial name
- Cronobacter malonaticus Iversen et al. 2008

Species of bacterium

Cronobacter malonaticus, formerly considered a subspecies of Cronobacter sakazakii, is a bacterium. Its type strain is CDC 1058-77^{T} (=LMG 23826^{T} =DSM 18702^{T}).
