= Pluralibacter =

Scientific classification
- Domain: Bacteria
- Kingdom: Pseudomonadati
- Phylum: Pseudomonadota
- Class: Gammaproteobacteria
- Order: Enterobacterales
- Family: Enterobacteriaceae
- Genus: Pluralibacter; Brady et al. 2013

Type species
- Pluralibacter gergoviae

Species
- P. gergoviae; P. pyrinus

Genus of bacteria

Pluralibacter is a genus of Gram negative bacteria from the family of Enterobacteriaceae. The genus consists of two species, P. gergoviae and P. pyrinus. Both species were originally classified in the genus Enterobacter but were reclassified into the novel genus Pluralibacter in 2013.
