= Gallaecimonas xiamenensis =

Scientific classification
- Domain: Bacteria
- Kingdom: Pseudomonadati
- Phylum: Pseudomonadota
- Class: Gammaproteobacteria
- Order: Enterobacterales
- Family: Gallaecimonadaceae
- Genus: Gallaecimonas
- Species: G. xiamenensis

Binomial name
- Gallaecimonas xiamenensis Wang et al. 2013

Type strain
- 3-C-1, CCTCC AB 209060, LMG 25226, MCCC 1A01354

Species of bacterium

Gallaecimonas xiamenensis is a Gram-negative, rod-shaped and motile bacterium from the genus of Gallaecimonas which has been isolated from seawater near the Xiamen Island in China.
