= Cronobacter turicensis =

Scientific classification
- Domain: Bacteria
- Kingdom: Pseudomonadati
- Phylum: Pseudomonadota
- Class: Gammaproteobacteria
- Order: Enterobacterales
- Family: Enterobacteriaceae
- Genus: Cronobacter
- Species: C. turicensis

Binomial name
- Cronobacter turicensis Iversen et al. 2007

Species of bacterium

Cronobacter turicensis is a bacterium. It is usually food-borne and pathogenic. It is named after Turicum, the Latin name of Zurich, as the type strain originates from there. Its type strain is strain 3032 (=LMG 23827T =DSMZ 18703T). This strain was first isolated from a fatal case of neonatal meningitis. C. Turicensis strains are indole negative but malonate, dulcitol and methyl-α-D-glucopyranoside positive.
