= Benapenem =

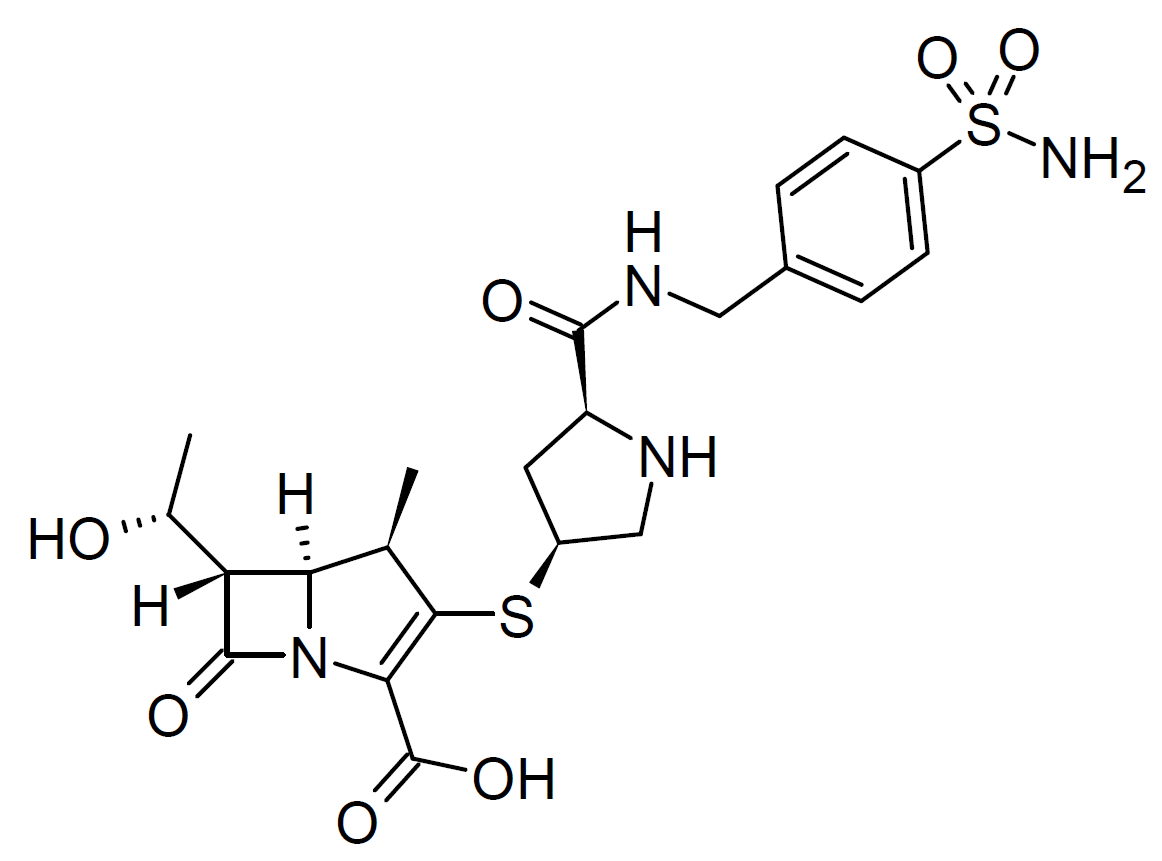

Legal status
- Legal status: Investigational

Identifiers
- IUPAC name: (4R,5S,6S)-6-[(1R)-1-hydroxyethyl]-4-methyl-7-oxo-3-[(3S,5S)-5-[(4-sulfamoylphenyl)methylcarbamoyl]pyrrolidin-3-yl]sulfanyl-1-azabicyclo[3.2.0]hept-2-ene-2-carboxylic acid
- CAS Number: 1312953-83-5
- PubChem CID: 58326208
- UNII: RE7F9LDG3H

Chemical and physical data
- Formula: C_{22}H_{28}N_{4}O_{7}S
- Molar mass: 492.55 g·mol^{−1}
- 3D model (JSmol): Interactive image
- SMILES: C[C@@H]1[C@@H]2[C@H](C(=O)N2C(=C1S[C@H]3C[C@H](NC3)C(=O)NCC4=CC=C(C=C4)S(=O)(=O)N)C(=O)O)[C@@H](C)O
- InChI: InChI=1S/C22H28N4O7S2/c1-10-17-16(11(2)27)21(29)26(17)18(22(30)31)19(10)34-13-7-15(24-9-13)20(28)25-8-12-3-5-14(6-4-12)35(23,32)33/h3-6,10-11,13,15-17,24,27H,7-9H2,1-2H3,(H,25,28)(H,30,31)(H2,23,32,33)/t10-,11-,13+,15+,16-,17-/m1/s1; Key:JNSMRGMLNPEWLR-PDCLSYJBSA-N

Benapenem is an experimental antibiotic drug for the treatment of Gram-negative bacterial infections such as with Enterobacter.
