= Gallaecimonas pentaromativorans =

Scientific classification
- Domain: Bacteria
- Kingdom: Pseudomonadati
- Phylum: Pseudomonadota
- Class: Gammaproteobacteria
- Order: Enterobacterales
- Family: Gallaecimonadaceae
- Genus: Gallaecimonas
- Species: G. pentaromativorans

Binomial name
- Gallaecimonas pentaromativorans Rodríguez-blanco et al. 2010

Type strain
- CECT 7479, CEE_131, DSM 21945

Species of bacterium

Gallaecimonas pentaromativorans is a Gram-negative, rod-shaped and halotolerant bacterium from the genus Gallaecimonas which has been isolated from sediments of the Corcubion Ria in A Coruña in Spain.
