= Cronobacter dublinensis =

Scientific classification
- Domain: Bacteria
- Kingdom: Pseudomonadati
- Phylum: Pseudomonadota
- Class: Gammaproteobacteria
- Order: Enterobacterales
- Family: Enterobacteriaceae
- Genus: Cronobacter
- Species: C. dublinensis

Binomial name
- Cronobacter dublinensis Iversen et al. 2007

Subspecies
- subsp. dublinensis; subsp. lactaridi; subsp. lausannensis

Species of bacterium

Cronobacter dublinensis is a bacterium. Its name pertains to Dublin, the origin of the type strain. The type strain is originally from a milk powder manufacturing facility (LMG 23823T =DSMZ 18705T). C. dublinensis sp. nov. is dulcitol negative and methyl-α-D-glucopyranoside positive and generally positive for indole production.
