= List of Moyasimon episodes =

Moyasimon: Tales of Agriculture, known in Japan as Moyashimon (もやしもん), is a manga series created by Masayuki Ishikawa. An 11-episode anime television series adaptation, animated by Shirogumi and Telecom Animation Film, aired between October and December 2007. A second season titled Moyasimon Returns aired between July and September 2012. The series follows Tadayasu Sawaki, a first-year college student at an agricultural university, who has a unique ability to see and communicate with bacteria and other micro-organisms. A live action series based on the manga was also produced. Both the two anime series and the live action series are parts of the Noitamina programming block on Fuji Television.

== Anime series ==
=== Moyasimon ===
No.	Title (Note: All English titles are taken from Crunchyroll.)	Original release date
1	"The Story of the Agricultural University Microbes"; Transliteration: "Nōdai Kin Monogatari" (Japanese: 農大菌物語)	October 12, 2007
It is the first day of Tadayasu and Kei's university life. Tadayasu shows off his ability to Professor Itsuki and Haruka. The talent show is cut short when Tadayasu spots fructivorans in the air.
2	"The 300 Million Yen Agricultural University Student"; Transliteration: "Sanoku En no Nōdaisei" (Japanese: 三億円の農大生)	October 19, 2007
Tadayasu and Kei follow the fructivorans and find a spilled tank of spoiled sake. They meet the perpetrators, Kaoru and Takuma, who invite them to their dorm room.
3	"The Microbes Are Gonna Brew!"; Transliteration: "Kin de Kamosuzo" (Japanese: 菌でかもすぞ)	October 26, 2007
Hazuki Oikawa is introduced. She comes to Kaoru and Takuma's dorm room and kills the bacteria they were planning to cultivate. Everyone is summoned back to the lab where Professor Itsuki and Haruka show them how to make sake for educational purposes.
4	"Microbes, Microbes Everywhere"; Transliteration: "Achikochi Kin Matsuri" (Japanese: あちこち菌祭り)	November 2, 2007
The first years are invited on a tour around the campus and a picnic. Tadayasu spots harmful bacteria in the food and saves everyone from E. coli food poisoning.
5	"Horrors! The Microbe Monster"; Transliteration: "Kaiki! Kin Obake" (Japanese: 怪奇! 菌オバケ)	November 9, 2007
Tadayasu becomes disgusted when he sees a man covered in microbes. Professor Itsuki asks everyone to buy liquor at Hiyoshi Liquor Store near the school. Tadayasu discovers the owner is the microbe monster who brews delicious sake.
6	"Enchanting! Miss Agricultural University"; Transliteration: "Nōsatsu! Misu Nōdai" (Japanese: 悩殺! ミス農大)	November 16, 2007
Aoi Mutō returns from a long trip bringing fermented meat. She also brings vibrio parahaemolyticus, El Tor, shigella dysenteriae, salmonella enterica, and plesiomonas shigelloides. After getting disinfected, Aoi brings Tadayasu to the UFO club room where all the members are sick and unintentionally breeding new forms of influenza with pigs and chickens.
7	"The Agricultural Spring Festival Begins!"; Transliteration: "Kaimaku! Nōdai Harusai" (Japanese: 開幕! 農大春祭)	November 23, 2007
The spring agricultural festival has started, and that means that during this time, the campus is closed and students have to exchange real money for school money, but when the festival ends the school money is worthless and cannot be exchanged back for real money. There are also many special rules related to the event that students have to find out on their own.
8	"The Battle to Capture the Main Gate"; Transliteration: "Nōdai Seimon Kōryakusen" (Japanese: 農大正門攻略戦)	November 30, 2007
It is the third day of the spring agricultural festival, and the students are forming a resistance in order to end the festival. At 4:00 PM, the students charge towards the front gate to engage in a battle, and during this time, Kaoru, Takuma, and Tadayasu work together to take down the robot in front of the gate and effectively end the festival. In return, they get 100,000 school yen which they use to get Professor Itsuki's aphrodisiac, they try to get one of the girls to take one but Haruka foils their plan by using all of them on herself, seemingly immune to their effects. Oikawa and Mutō get some from the professor themselves and the next morning Oikawa discovers that she had slept with Muto.
9	"Cling to That Soft Skin"; Transliteration: "Yawahada ni Toritsuke" (Japanese: 柔肌にとりつけ)	December 7, 2007
Professor Itsuki holds a celebration for Kaoru and Takuma getting part-time jobs, and during this party introduces everyone to the foul-smelling surströmming. Later, Haruka is summoned to a private dinner with her father and fiancé, but gets Kaoru and Takuma, who had actually been working at the restaurant before getting fired by Haruka minutes before, to think of something to get her out of the dinner. They call Tadayasu who brings a can of surströmming; once the can is opened, Kaoru and Takuma take Haruka out in the confusion and go to a bar.
10	"The Gothic Lolita's Kiss"; Transliteration: "Gosurori Kissu" (Japanese: ゴスロリキッス)	December 14, 2007
Tadayasu is trapped, by Kei, to help Hazuki carry a heavy mat to her apartment. He appears to have lost his ability to see microbes the next day, resulting in Kaoru and Takuma eating some spoiled food and having a good run for their money.
11	"A Shining Microbe Future"; Transliteration: "Kagayaku Kin Mirai" (Japanese: 輝く菌未来)	December 21, 2007
Tadayasu realizes that he can't see microbes after the shock of the Gothic Lolita Kiss, and Haruka questions his usefulness without his special ability. However, even unseen the microbes continue to root for Tadayasu and write his name on a piece of bread to show support. Knowing that his microbes are always with him Tadayasu becomes confident again and makes up with Haruka the next day, and regains his special ability shortly afterwards.

=== Moyasimon Returns ===
No.	Title	Original release date
1	"The Moyashi Gang Rises"; Transliteration: "Moyashidomo Tatsu" (Japanese: もやしども起つ)	July 6, 2012
The team has two important activities to perform, thus is divided into two groups, with Tadayasu, Oikawa and Yuuki in one and the rest in the other. Oikawa finds a suspicious entrance that when she returns later is not there anymore, and confesses to Tadayasu that somehow she feels that everyone is hiding something from her.
2	"The Fermenting Cellar"; Transliteration: "Hakkōgura" (Japanese: 発酵蔵)	July 13, 2012
Tadayasu teams up with Oikawa to find the truth about the mysterious door while Haruka is warned by her father that the time is running out for her to wrap up her research and fulfill the promise she made to him.
3	"Team Oikawa"; Transliteration: "Chīmu Oikawa" (Japanese: チーム及川)	July 20, 2012
Haruka is worried about her father's demands while Tadayasu and the others pay a visit to the remodeled Hiyoshi's liquor store and learn about what lies behind the secret door. Oikawa gets depressed about not finding anything important after so much effort to discover about it, and to cheer her up, Tadayasu decides to reveal his secret to her.
4	"An Autumn of Change"; Transliteration: "Henka no Aki" (Japanese: 変化の秋)	July 27, 2012
Tadayasu confesses his secret to Oikawa, but she does not believe him at all. Haruka is picked up by her father who leaves her letter of resignation in Mutō's hands. While Haruka embarks on a trip with her fiancé against her will, the students start to make preparations for the upcoming Harvest Festival. Oikawa and Mutō refrain from telling the boys the truth about Haruka's sudden absence.
5	"The Harvest Festival"; Transliteration: "Shūkakusai" (Japanese: 収穫祭)	August 3, 2012
The Harvest Festival begins. Misato and Kawahama mount a Pulque stand leaving Tadayasu and the others to attend the customers by themselves, while they approach the guest idol with unknown intentions. Meanwhile, Professor Itsuki makes his move in an attempt to bring Haruka back to the University.
6	"Teamwork"; Transliteration: "Chīmuwāku" (Japanese: チームワーク)	August 10, 2012
As the Harvest Festival goes on, Tadayasu learns the reason for Haruka's absence, while her father falls in Professor Itsuki's trap. Misato and Kawahama's grand scheme is a success, but instead of keeping the money for themselves they decide to use it to look for Haruka in Paris.
7	"Bird in a Cage"; Transliteration: "Kago no Tori" (Japanese: かごの鳥)	August 17, 2012
Misato and Kawahama's antics during the Harvest Festival cost them a 20 days suspension and Professor Itsuki takes the opportunity to have them accompany Tadayasu's search for Haruka in Paris. Despite Sawaki's protests, the trio ends up goofing around the city until all their money runs out, and only then they finally start to look for her. Little they know she is already far away from the capital, in the outskirts of Mont Saint-Michel.
8	"Mariage"; Transliteration: "Mariāju" (Japanese: マリアージュ)	August 24, 2012
While looking for Haruka in Burgundy, Sawaki and co. stumble on Marie, a French girl who also speaks Japanese and has a striking resemblance with Yuuki. The trio is drafted by Marie to work as waiters in a special banquet held at her place, and much to their surprise, they finally meet Haruka in the occasion.
9	"On the Route des Grand Crus"; Transliteration: "Guran Kuryu Kaidō nite" (Japanese: グラン＝クリュ街道にて)	August 31, 2012
Haruka asks for Misato and Kawahama to take her back to Japan, but with her fiancé's escorts looking for her, they decide to go separate ways to evade them. Sawaki confronts Marie about her reluctance to inherit her family's winery despite she is so enthusiastic about her life on it, while Misato and Haruka manage to evade her pursuers and surprisingly end up having some quality time together.
10	"Misunderstandings"; Transliteration: "Surechigau Omoi" (Japanese: すれちがう思い)	September 7, 2012
Sawaki and the others bid farewell to Marie, but before departing, Sawaki have the microbes there to write a message of encouragement to her and her father. Haruka returns to confront her fiancé just to find him ill. As she tends to his condition, the two finally comes to terms.
11	"We're Home"; Transliteration: "Tadaima" (Japanese: ただいま)	September 14, 2012
Before returning home, Sawaki and his friends meet Marie once more and learn that the messages left by the microbes helped her family to resolve their differences and move on with their family business. Finally back at Japan, Hasegawa wonders about what she should do from then on, as with her engagement cancelled, there is no reason for her to remain at the university, but Sawaki encourages her to move on with her career not for obligation but for doing what she really wants to.

== Live action series ==
No.	Title	Original release date (Note: Moyasimon aired on Fuji TV on Thursday 24:45, effectively Friday at 12:45 a.m. JST.)
1	"Entering College"; Transliteration: "Nyūgaku" (Japanese: 入学)	July 9, 2010
2	"Ability"; Transliteration: "Nōryoku" (Japanese: 能力)	July 16, 2010
3	"UFO Club"; Transliteration: "UFO-ken" (Japanese: UFO研)	July 23, 2010
4	"Kuchikami Sake"; Transliteration: "Kuchikami Sake" (Japanese: 口噛み酒)	July 30, 2010
5	"Love Potion"; Transliteration: "Horegusuri" (Japanese: 惚れ薬)	August 6, 2010
6	"Disclosures"; Transliteration: "Hakkaku" (Japanese: 発覚)	August 13, 2010
7	"Mending the Fence"; Transliteration: "Nakanaori" (Japanese: 仲直り)	August 20, 2010
8	"Parting"; Transliteration: "Wakare" (Japanese: 別れ)	August 27, 2010
9	"Harvest Festival"; Transliteration: "Shūkaku-sai" (Japanese: 収穫祭)	September 3, 2010
10	"Miss Agri-U"; Transliteration: "Misu Nōdai" (Japanese: ミス農大)	September 10, 2010
11	"Rescue"; Transliteration: "Dakkan" (Japanese: 奪還)	September 17, 2010
