= NDUFA9 =

Protein-coding gene in the species Homo sapiens

Identifiers
- Aliases: NDUFA9, CC6, CI-39k, CI39k, NDUFS2L, SDR22E1, NADH:ubiquinone oxidoreductase subunit A9, MC1DN26, COQ11
- External IDs: OMIM: 603834; MGI: 1913358; GeneCards: NDUFA9

Gene location (Human)
Chr.	Chromosome 12 (human)
Band	12p13.32	Start	4,649,095 bp
Band	12p13.32	End	4,694,317 bp

Gene location (Mouse)
Chr.	Chromosome 6 (mouse)
Band	6|6 F3	Start	126,798,684 bp
Band	6|6 F3	End	126,826,099 bp
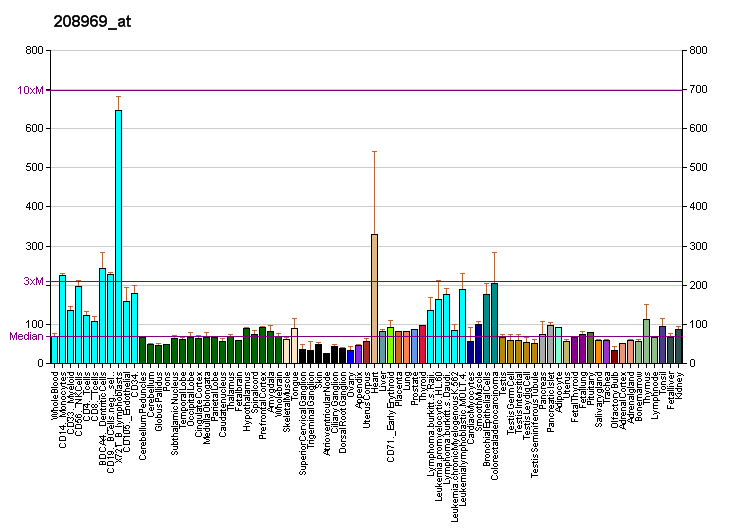

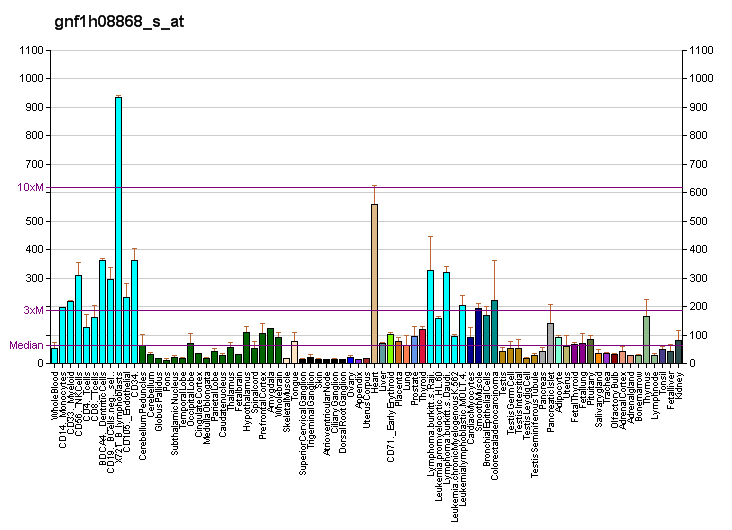
RNA expression pattern
Bgee	Human / Mouse (ortholog); Top expressed in: apex of heart; mucosa of transverse colon; left ventricle; muscle of thigh; right auricle of heart; rectum; gastrocnemius muscle; triceps brachii muscle; right ventricle; olfactory zone of nasal mucosa / Top expressed in: interventricular septum; soleus muscle; myocardium of ventricle; extraocular muscle; plantaris muscle; cardiac muscle tissue of left ventricle; digastric muscle; thoracic diaphragm; sternocleidomastoid muscle; extensor digitorum longus muscle; More reference expression data
BioGPS	More reference expression data
Gene ontology
Molecular function	protein-containing complex binding; NADH dehydrogenase (ubiquinone) activity; protein binding; catalytic activity; NADH dehydrogenase activity
Cellular component	mitochondrial respiratory chain complex I; mitochondrial matrix; respirasome; mitochondrial membranes; mitochondrion; nucleus; nucleoplasm
Biological process	sodium ion transport; ubiquinone-6 biosynthetic process; mitochondrial electron transport, NADH to ubiquinone; mitochondrial respiratory chain complex I assembly; circadian rhythm; response to glucose
Sources:Amigo / QuickGO
Orthologs
Databases	NCBI: entry; OMA: entry
Species	Human	Mouse
Entrez	4704	66108
Ensembl	ENSG00000139180	ENSMUSG00000000399
UniProt	Q16795	Q9DC69
RefSeq (mRNA)	NM_005002	NM_025358
RefSeq (protein)	NP_004993	NP_079634
Location (UCSC)	Chr 12: 4.65 – 4.69 Mb	Chr 6: 126.8 – 126.83 Mb
PubMed search
- Wikidata
View/Edit Human	View/Edit Mouse

NADH dehydrogenase [ubiquinone] 1 alpha subcomplex subunit 9 is an enzyme that in humans is encoded by the NDUFA9 gene. The NDUFA9 protein is a subunit of NADH:ubiquinone oxidoreductase (Complex I of the electron transport chain), which is located in the mitochondrial inner membrane and is the largest of the five complexes of the electron transport chain. Mutations in NADH dehydrogenase (ubiquinone), also known as Complex I, frequently lead to complex neurodegenerative diseases such as Leigh's syndrome. In the case of NDUFA9, a mutation to the MT-ND3 gene might interrupt their interaction and formation of subcomplexes, compromising Complex I function and leading to disease.

== Structure ==
The NDUFA9 gene is located on the p arm of chromosome 12 in position 13.3 and spans 45,222 base pairs. The gene produces a 42.5 kDa protein composed of 377 amino acids. NDUFA9 is a subunit of the enzyme NADH dehydrogenase (ubiquinone), the largest of the respiratory complexes. The structure is L-shaped with a long, hydrophobic transmembrane domain and a hydrophilic domain for the peripheral arm that includes all the known redox centers and the NADH binding site. It has been noted that the N-terminal hydrophobic domain has the potential to be folded into an alpha helix spanning the inner mitochondrial membrane with a C-terminal hydrophilic domain interacting with globular subunits of Complex I. The highly conserved two-domain structure suggests that this feature is critical for the protein function and that the hydrophobic domain acts as an anchor for the NADH dehydrogenase (ubiquinone) complex at the inner mitochondrial membrane. NDUFA9 is one of about 31 hydrophobic subunits that form the transmembrane region of Complex I, but it is an accessory subunit that is believed not to be involved in catalysis. The predicted secondary structure is primarily alpha helix, but the carboxy-terminal half of the protein has high potential to adopt a coiled-coil form. The amino-terminal part contains a putative beta sheet rich in hydrophobic amino acids that may serve as mitochondrial import signal.

== Function ==
The human NDUFA9 gene codes for a subunit of Complex I of the respiratory chain, which transfers electrons from NADH to ubiquinone. NADH binds to Complex I and transfers two electrons to the isoalloxazine ring of the flavin mononucleotide (FMN) prosthetic arm to form FMNH_{2}. The electrons are transferred through a series of iron-sulfur (Fe-S) clusters in the prosthetic arm and finally to coenzyme Q10 (CoQ), which is reduced to ubiquinol (CoQH_{2}). The flow of electrons changes the redox state of the protein, resulting in a conformational change and pK shift of the ionizable side chain, which pumps four hydrogen ions out of the mitochondrial matrix.

== Clinical significance ==
Decreased expression of NDUFA9 is associated with Leigh's syndrome, a severe neurological disorder that typically arises in the first year of life, is characterized by progressive loss of mental and movement abilities, and typically results in death within a couple of years, usually due to respiratory failure. A mutation in the MT-ND3 gene (tyrosine to cytosine at the 10191 position) results in a substitution of serine for proline, which may introduce instability of Complex I due to the inability form subcomplexes between MT-ND3 and NDUFA9. However, this genetic identification may not be suitable for prenatal testing because of the mutation's age and tissue dependence.

== Interactions ==
NDUFA9 has been shown to have 135 binary protein-protein interactions including 112 co-complex interactions. NDUFA9 appears to interact with BLOC1S1, NDUFS1, NOA1, CYSRT1, KRTAP6-2, CIAO1, MT-ND3, TSC22D1, DNAJA3, SIRT3, MAGED1, and SSR1.
