= Cronobacter muytjensii =

Scientific classification
- Domain: Bacteria
- Kingdom: Pseudomonadati
- Phylum: Pseudomonadota
- Class: Gammaproteobacteria
- Order: Enterobacterales
- Family: Enterobacteriaceae
- Genus: Cronobacter
- Species: C. muytjensii

Binomial name
- Cronobacter muytjensii Iversen et al. 2007

Species of bacterium

Cronobacter muytjensii is a bacterium. It is named after Harry Muytjens. Its type strain is ATCC 51329^{T} (=CIP 103581^{T}). It is indole, dulcitol, and malonate positive but palatinose and methyl-α-D-glucopyranoside negative.
