= Budviciaceae =

Scientific classification
- Domain: Bacteria
- Kingdom: Pseudomonadati
- Phylum: Pseudomonadota
- Class: Gammaproteobacteria
- Order: Enterobacterales
- Family: Budviciaceae; Adeolu et al., 2016

Genera
- Budvicia; Jinshanibacter; Leminorella; Pragia

Family of bacteria

The Budviciaceae are a family of gram-negative bacteria. This family is a member of the order Enterobacterales in the class Gammaproteobacteria of the phylum Pseudomonadota. The type genus of this family is Budvicia.

The name Budviciaceae is derived from the Latin term Budvicia, referring the type genus of the family and the suffix "-aceae", an ending used to denote a family. Together, Budviciceae refers to a family whose nomenclatural type is the genus Budvicia.

== Biochemical characteristics and molecular signatures ==
Members are catalase-positive, oxidase-negative, and negative for indole, arginine dihydrolase, ornithine decarboxylase, and lysine decarboxylase. These bacteria are capable of producing hydrogen disulfide and reducing nitrate, but are incapable of growing on KCN media.

Nine conserved signature indels (CSIs) were identified through genomic analyses for this family in the proteins bifunctional protein-disulfide isomerise/oxidoreductase DsbC, L-methionine/branched chain amino acid transporter, D-alanine-D-alanine ligase, and hypothetical proteins. These CSIs are unique molecular signatures, and thus provide a molecular means of identification and differentiation for Budviciaceae species from other families in the order Enterobacterales and all other bacteria.

== Historical systematics and current taxonomy ==
Budviciceae, as of 2021, contains four validly published genera. Members of this family were originally members of the family Enterobacteriaceae, a large phylogenetically unrelated group of species with distinct biochemical characteristics and different ecological niches. The original assignment of species into the family Enterobacteriaceae was largely based on 16S rRNA genome sequence analyses, which is known to have low discriminatory power and the results of which changes depends on the algorithm and organism information used. Despite this, the analyses still exhibited polyphyletic branching, indicating the presence of distinct subgroups within the family.

In 2016, Adeolu et al. proposed the division of Enterobacteriaceae into 7 novel families based on comparative genomic analyses and the branching pattern of various phylogenetic trees constructed from conserved genome sequences, 16S rRNA sequences and multilocus sequence analyses. Molecular markers, specifically conserved signature indels, specific to this family were also identified as evidence supporting the division independent of phylogenetic trees.
