= Yokenella =

Scientific classification
- Domain: Bacteria
- Kingdom: Pseudomonadati
- Phylum: Pseudomonadota
- Class: Gammaproteobacteria
- Order: Enterobacterales
- Family: Enterobacteriaceae
- Genus: Yokenella; Kosako, 1984

Species
- Y. regensburgei

Genus of bacteria

Yokenella is a genus of bacteria of the family Enterobacteriaceae. Yokenella are Gram-negative, motile, rod-shaped bacteria. Strains of bacteria forming this genus were originally isolated from clinical samples, from the boxelder bug, and from alligators.

There is only one species in this genus: Yokenella regensburgei.

Yokenella is not an important pathogen, but it has been found in sporadic cases of finger osteitis, necrotizing fasciitis, in urinary tract infections, and a few other diseases, some of which may have been caused by immunosupression.

A draft genome sequence is 5,277,883 bp in size and has 5,416 genes. The genome is thus larger than average bacterial genomes, such as Escherichia coli whose genome is about 4 MB in size.
