= Gallaecimonas =

Scientific classification
- Domain: Bacteria
- Kingdom: Pseudomonadati
- Phylum: Pseudomonadota
- Class: Gammaproteobacteria
- Order: Enterobacterales
- Family: Gallaecimonadaceae; Chuvochina et al. 2024
- Genus: Gallaecimonas; Rodríguez-Blanco et al. 2010

Species
- Gallaecimonas kandeliae; Gallaecimonas mangrovi; Gallaecimonas pentaromativorans; Gallaecimonas xiamenensis

Genus of bacteria

Gallaecimonas is a genus of bacteria that was first described in 2010 with the isolation of Gallaecimonas pentaromativorans by Rodríguez Blanco et al. from intertidal sediments of the ria of Corcubión (Galicia, Spain). It is a Gram-negative, rod-shaped, halotolerant bacterium in the class Gammaproteobacteria. It can degrade high molecular mass polycyclic aromatic hydrocarbons of 4 and 5 rings. The 16S rRNA gene sequences of the type strain CEE_131(T) proved to be distantly related to those of Rheinheimera and Serratia. Its G+C content was 41.7 mol%. Gallaecimonas pentaromativorans strain 10A that was isolated from a Pacific oyster during a mass mortality event in British Columbia (BC), Canada. It has a circular genome of 4,322,156 bp with 3,928 protein-coding sequences, including pathways putatively involved in degradation of xenobiotic compounds including polycyclic aromatic hydrocarbons. Mining of publicly available databases demonstrated that members of the genus are globally widespread in freshwater and marine environments.

This bacterial ability to degrade high mass polycyclic aromatic compounds is interesting because these compounds are common pollutants spilled in the environment by human activities and tend to accumulate and persist adsorbed to the organic fraction of sediments. Many of those containing 4 to 6 rings are mutagenic, cancerogenic or teratogenic.

The genus name comes from the ancient Latin name of Galicia, Gallaecia, and monas, "monad", and the term pentaromativorans (pent + aromati + vorans) refers to "degrading/devouring aromatic compounds with five rings".

In 2012, Jianning Wang et al. isolated the species Gallaecimonas xiamenensis from a crude oil degrading consortium of microorganisms found in Xiamen island (China). Phylogenetic analysis based on 16S rRNA gene sequences of the strain 3C-1-T indicated it was a member of Gallaecimonas. It is a Gram-negative, rod-shaped, motile bacterium incapable of nitrate reduction, with a G+C content of 61.3 mol%.
