= Buttiauxella =

Scientific classification
- Domain: Bacteria
- Kingdom: Pseudomonadati
- Phylum: Pseudomonadota
- Class: Gammaproteobacteria
- Order: Enterobacterales
- Family: Enterobacteriaceae
- Genus: Buttiauxella; Ferragut et al. 1982

Type species
- Buttiauxella agrestis

Species
- Buttiauxella agrestis Buttiauxella brennerae Buttiauxella ferragutiae Buttiauxella gaviniae Buttiauxella izardii Buttiauxella noackiae Buttiauxella warmboldiae

Genus of bacteria

Buttiauxella is a Gram-negative, aerobic, facultative anaerobic and motile genus of bacteria within the family Enterobacteriaceae.
