= Shimwellia =

Scientific classification
- Domain: Bacteria
- Kingdom: Pseudomonadati
- Phylum: Pseudomonadota
- Class: Gammaproteobacteria
- Order: Enterobacterales
- Family: Enterobacteriaceae
- Genus: Shimwellia; Priest and Barker 2010

Species
- S. blattae S. pseudoproteus

Genus of bacteria

Shimwellia is a genus of Gram-negative bacteria of the family Enterobacteriaceae. The two species of Shimwellia are Shimwellia blattae (formerly Escherichia blattae) and Shimwellia pseudoproteus (formerly Obesumbacterium pseudoproteus).

Species in Shimwellia are genetically similar to Escherichia but differ in notable ways. S. blattae can synthesize coenzyme B12 and S. pseudoproteus is associated with beer spoilage.
