= Plesiomonas shigelloides =

Scientific classification
- Domain: Bacteria
- Kingdom: Pseudomonadati
- Phylum: Pseudomonadota
- Class: Gammaproteobacteria
- Order: Enterobacterales
- Family: Enterobacteriaceae
- Genus: Plesiomonas corrig. Habs and Schubert 1962
- Species: P. shigelloides

Binomial name
- Plesiomonas shigelloides corrig. (Bader 1954); Habs and Schubert 1962

Synonyms
- Pseudomonas shigelloides Bader 1954; Aeromonas shigelloides (Bader 1954) Ewing et al. 1961; Fergusonia shigelloides (Bader 1954) Sebald and Véron 1963

Species of bacterium

Plesiomonas shigelloides is a species of bacteria and the only member of its genus. It is a Gram-negative, rod-shaped bacterium which has been isolated from freshwater, freshwater fish, shellfish, cattle, goats, swine, cats, dogs, monkeys, vultures, snakes, toads and humans. It is considered a fecal coliform. P. shigelloides is a global distributed species, found globally outside of the polar ice caps.

P. shigelloides has been associated with the diarrheal disease state in humans, but has been identified in healthy humans as well. It can enter the body either through contact with water contaminated by fecal matter or through seafood originating from a contaminated source.

== Classification ==
P. shigelloides was originally considered part of the family Vibrionaceae, but is generally accepted to be part of Enterobacteriaceae due to the similarity of its 5S rRNA sequence to other members of Enterobacteriaceae. The rRNA sequence of P. shigelloides has been found to be most similar to Proteus mirabilis, and as a result it is now considered part of the tribe Proteeae within the family Enterobacteriaceae. P. shigelloides is the only known member of its genus.

== Ecology ==
=== Growth ===
P. shigelloides is incapable of surviving in saltwater environments where the concentration of salt is greater than 4% and has been found to tolerate pH ranges between 4.5 and 9. It grows optimally between 35 °C and 39 °C, and has been found to survive in the temperature range of 8 °C to 45 °C. The effects of pH, salinity, temperature, turbidity, and conductivity on concentrations of P. shigelloides in freshwater conditions is not currently understood.

== Identification ==
P. shigelloides grows readily on standard laboratory media such as MacConkey agar.

Some Plesiomonas strains share antigens with Shigella sonnei and Shigella flexneri and cross-reactions with Shigella antisera may occur. Plesiomonas can be distinguished from Shigella in diarrheal stools by an oxidase test: Plesiomonas is oxidase positive and Shigella is oxidase negative. Plesiomonas is easily differentiated from Aeromonas sp. and other oxidase-positive organisms by standard biochemical tests.

== Pathogenicity ==
P. shigelloides produces a cytoxic-enterotoxin (LCE) which induces rapid death in mice. LCE is the first virulence factor identified in P. shigelloides that is exported through membrane vesicles.

=== Human infection ===
P. shigelloides has been isolated from a wide variety of human clinical specimens including both intestinal (usually feces or rectal swabs) and extra-intestinal. It has been isolated from the feces of humans, both with and without diarrhea, and/or vomiting (gastroenteritis). Although reports have found a link between P. shigelloides and diarrhea or gastroenteritis, research has not yet determined whether this bacteria is always responsible for these conditions.

=== Infection of other animals ===
Although P. shigelloides is primarily associated with the diarrheal disease state in humans, certain animals including cats and dogs have been found to frequently carry the bacterium while in a healthy state. Freshwater fish can often be infected with P. shigelloides which can be lethal depending on the concentration of the bacterium in their bodies.
