= Scandinavium goeteborgense =

Scientific classification
- Domain: Bacteria
- Kingdom: Pseudomonadati
- Phylum: Pseudomonadota
- Class: Gammaproteobacteria
- Order: Enterobacterales
- Family: Enterobacteriaceae
- Genus: Scandinavium; Marathe et al., 2020
- Species: S. goeteborgense

Binomial name
- Scandinavium goeteborgense Marathe et al., 2020

Species of bacterium

Scandinavium (named after the region in Northern Europe) is a genus of Gram-negative, facultative anaerobic, oxidase-negative, rod-shaped, motile bacteria of the family Enterobacteriaceae. It contains a single species, Scandinavium goeteborgense (named after the Swedish city of Gothenburg). The type strain of the species is S. goeteborgense CCUG 66741^{T} = CECT 9823^{T} = NCTC 14286^{T} and its genome sequence is publicly available in DNA Data Bank of Japan, European Nucleotide Archive and GenBank under the accession number LYLP00000000.
