= Cedecea =

Scientific classification
- Domain: Bacteria
- Kingdom: Pseudomonadati
- Phylum: Pseudomonadota
- Class: Gammaproteobacteria
- Order: Enterobacterales
- Family: Enterobacteriaceae
- Genus: Cedecea; Grimont et al. 1981

Species
- C. davisae; C. lapegei; Cedecea species 001 (also known as Cedecea species 3); C. neteri (formerly known as Cedecea species 4 or Cedecea species 002); Cedecea species 012 (also known as Cedecea species 5)

Genus of bacteria

Cedecea is a genus of extremely rare bacteria of the family Enterobacteriaceae. The name of this genus was derived from CDC, the abbreviation for the Centers for Disease Control where the initial members of this genus were discovered. This genus resembles no other group of Enterobacteriaceae. Cedecea bacteria are Gram-negative, bacillus in shape, motile, nonencapsulated, and non-spore-forming. The strains of Cedecea appear to be similar to those of Serratia. Both Cedecea and Serratia are lipase positive and resistant to colistin and cephalothin; however, Cedecea is unable to hydrolyze gelatin or DNA.

== History of genus ==
Cedecea bacteria were discovered in 1977 by a group of scientists at the CDC and were initially named “Enteric Group 15”. In 1980, Patrick A. D. Grimont and Francine Grimont proposed the genus name of Cedecea for this group. This particular name was given to "Enteric Group 15" for the abbreviation of the Center for Disease Control (CDC) where the group of bacteria was discovered. At this time, six species have been identified. Currently, three strains have been named while three remain unnamed.

Cedecea davisae was named after Betty Davis. Davis is an American bacteriologist who has contributed to serological and biochemical identification of Enterobacteriaceae and Vibrionaceae.

Cedecea lapagei was named after Stephen Lapage, who is a British bacteriologist. Lapage has contributed to bacterial systematics as the editor of Bacteriological Code. Lapage has also made many contributions to the family Enterobacteriaceae.

Cedecea neteri was named after Erwin Neter. Neter is an American microbiologist and physician. Like Davis and Lapage, Neter has contributed to the family Enterobacteriaceae.

== Clinical ==
Cedecea strains are rarely isolated from the environment or living human tissues. However, strains have, at one or more times, been isolated from the following human specimen: sputum, blood, skin wounds, gall bladder, urine and lung tissue. These specimen were collected from a handful of patients who were elderly, medically compromised or immunocompromised. Even though these strains have been isolated, their role in disease and clinical significance is yet to be discovered.

== Treatment ==
Patients who are infected with Cedecea can benefit from antibiotic therapy; however, this can be a challenge due to Cedecea strains being resistant to a range of antimicrobial agents. Cedecea strains are resistant to the following antimicrobial agents: cephalothin, extended spectrum cephalosporins, colistin, and several aminoglycosides.

== Ecology ==
Several members of the Entereobacteriaceae live in the intestines of other organisms, and Cedecea have been isolated in wild tsetse flies and cockroaches. In humans, Cedecea has been located in the blood and saliva, wounds and abscesses, and in ulcerated tissue. The bacteria has been isolated and a limited amount of samples have been taken. Although resistant to several antibiotics, Cedecea - along with several other bacteria - has been shown to be subject to high antibacterial activity from Bovine lactoperoxidase.
