= Pseudocitrobacter =

Scientific classification
- Domain: Bacteria
- Kingdom: Pseudomonadati
- Phylum: Pseudomonadota
- Class: Gammaproteobacteria
- Order: Enterobacterales
- Family: Enterobacteriaceae
- Genus: Pseudocitrobacter

Species
- Pseudocitrobacter faecalis; Pseudocitrobacter anthropi

Genus of bacteria

Pseudocitrobacter is a genus of gram-negative, facultatively anaerobic, rod-shaped, non-hemolytic, and oxidase-negative bacteria. It was first isolated from stool samples from a Pakistani hospital.
