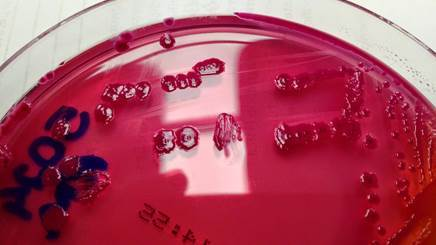
- Colonies of P. diazotrophicus on MacConkey agar.

Scientific classification
- Domain: Bacteria
- Kingdom: Pseudomonadati
- Phylum: Pseudomonadota
- Class: Gammaproteobacteria
- Order: Enterobacterales
- Family: Enterobacteriaceae
- Genus: Phytobacter; Zhang et al. 2008

Type species
- Phytobacter diazotrophicus

Species
- P. diazotrophicus P. ursingii P. palmae P. cepae P. massiliensis

= Phytobacter =

Genus of bacteria

Phytobacter is a genus of Gram-negative bacteria emerging from the grouping of isolates previously assigned to various genera of the family Enterobacteriaceae. This genus was first established on the basis of nitrogen fixing isolates from wild rice in China, but also includes a number of isolates obtained during a 2013 multi-state sepsis outbreak in Brazil and, retrospectively, several clinical strains isolated in the 1970s in the United States that are still available in culture collections, which originally were grouped into Brenner's Biotype XII of the Erwinia herbicola-Enterobacter agglomerans-Complex (EEC). Standard biochemical evaluation panels are lacking Phytobacter spp. from their database, thus often leading to misidentifications with other Enterobacterales species, especially Pantoea agglomerans. Clinical isolates of the species have been identified as an important source of extended-spectrum β-lactamase and carbapenem-resistance genes, which are usually mediated by genetic mobile elements. Strong protection of co-infecting sensitive bacteria has also been reported. Bacteria belonging to this genus are not pigmented, chemoorganotrophic and able to fix nitrogen. They are lactose fermenting, cytochrome-oxidase negative and catalase positive. Glucose is fermented with the production of gas. Colonies growing on MacConkey agar (MAC) are circular, convex and smooth with non-entire margins and a usually elevated center. Five species are currently validly included in the genus Phytobacter, which is still included within the Kosakonia clade in the lately reviewed family of Enterobacteriaceae. The incorporation of Phytobacter massiliensis has been proposed via the unification of the genera Metakosakonia and Phytobacter. More recently, a fifth species, Phytobacter cepae, isolated from onion (Allium cepa) and characterized by phylogenomic analyses based on whole-genome sequencing, average nucleotide identity and in silico DNA–DNA hybridization, has been proposed.

== Taxonomic history and synonymy ==
First described as Bacillus agglomerans in 1888 by M. W. Beijerinck and later reclassified by Ewing and Fife as Enterobacter agglomerans, the EEC has a history of many names changes and taxonomy updates that follows the evolution of taxonomy tools. In 1984, Brenner and coworkers, using DNA-DNA hybridization test, divided the EEC into thirtheen DNA relatedness groups (Biotypes), numbered from I to XIII. In 1989, Françoise Gavini and coworkers proposed to rename Enterobacter agglomerans (previously included in Biotypes I and XIII) as Pantoea agglomerans, while the genus Phytobacter emerged from the characterization of Biotype XII.

Mislabelled genome sequences in public databases have also contributed to taxonomic confusion within the genus. For example, genomes deposited under the names "Citrobacter bitternis" and "Kluyvera intestini" have been shown by phylogenomic analyses to belong to Phytobacter diazotrophicus and have been proposed as heterotypic synonyms of that species.

== Species ==
- Phytobacter diazotrophicus is the most common Phytobacter species recovered from the environment and humans and is an opportunistic pathogen associated with contaminated catheters or the use of total parenteral nutrition.
- Phytobacter ursingii can biochemically be differentiated from Phytobacter diazotrophicus on the basis of its ability to metabolize d-serine and l-sorbose. Despite the presence of nitrogen-fixation genes suggests an environmental origin, only clinical isolates of the species have been reported so far.
- Phytobacter palmae is a species with high nitrogen fixing ability that was first identified in Singapore in leaf tissues of oil palm (Elaeis guineensis).
- Phytobacter cepae, which was isolated from onion bulbs in the United States along to other Enterobacteriaceae and does not possess nitrogen-fixation (nif) genes.
- Phytobacter massiliensis, whose type strain JC163^{T} was isolated from the fecal flora of a healthy Senegalese patient. This species also appears not to harbour the nif operon.

== In popular culture ==
The 2025 documentary A saga do Phytobacter, which is available on YouTube, recounts the history of the discovery of the genus Phytobacter and its growing relevance as an opportunistic human pathogen.
