= S-formylglutathione hydrolase =

Class of enzymes

Identifiers
- EC no.: 3.1.2.12
- CAS no.: 50812-21-0

Databases
- BRENDA: enzyme data
- ExPASy: NiceZyme view
- KEGG: enzyme entry
- MetaCyc: metabolic pathway
- Rhea: reactions
- PDB structures: RCSB PDB PDBe PDBsum
- Gene Ontology: AmiGO / QuickGO
Search
- PMC: articles
- PubMed: articles
- NCBI: proteins

The enzyme S-formylglutathione hydrolase (EC 3.1.2.12) catalyzes the reaction

S-formylglutathione
H_{2}O
glutathione
+
formic acid

The enzyme characterised from human liver hydrolyses S-formylglutathione to glutathione and formic acid, which forms the thioester in the starting material. The enzyme is part of a biochemical pathway that removes formaldehyde, which is toxic to many organisms. The structure of the enzyme from Pseudoalteromonas haloplanktis has been determined by X-ray crystallography.

This enzyme is a hydrolase, specifically one acting on thioester bonds. The systematic name is S-formylglutathione hydrolase.
