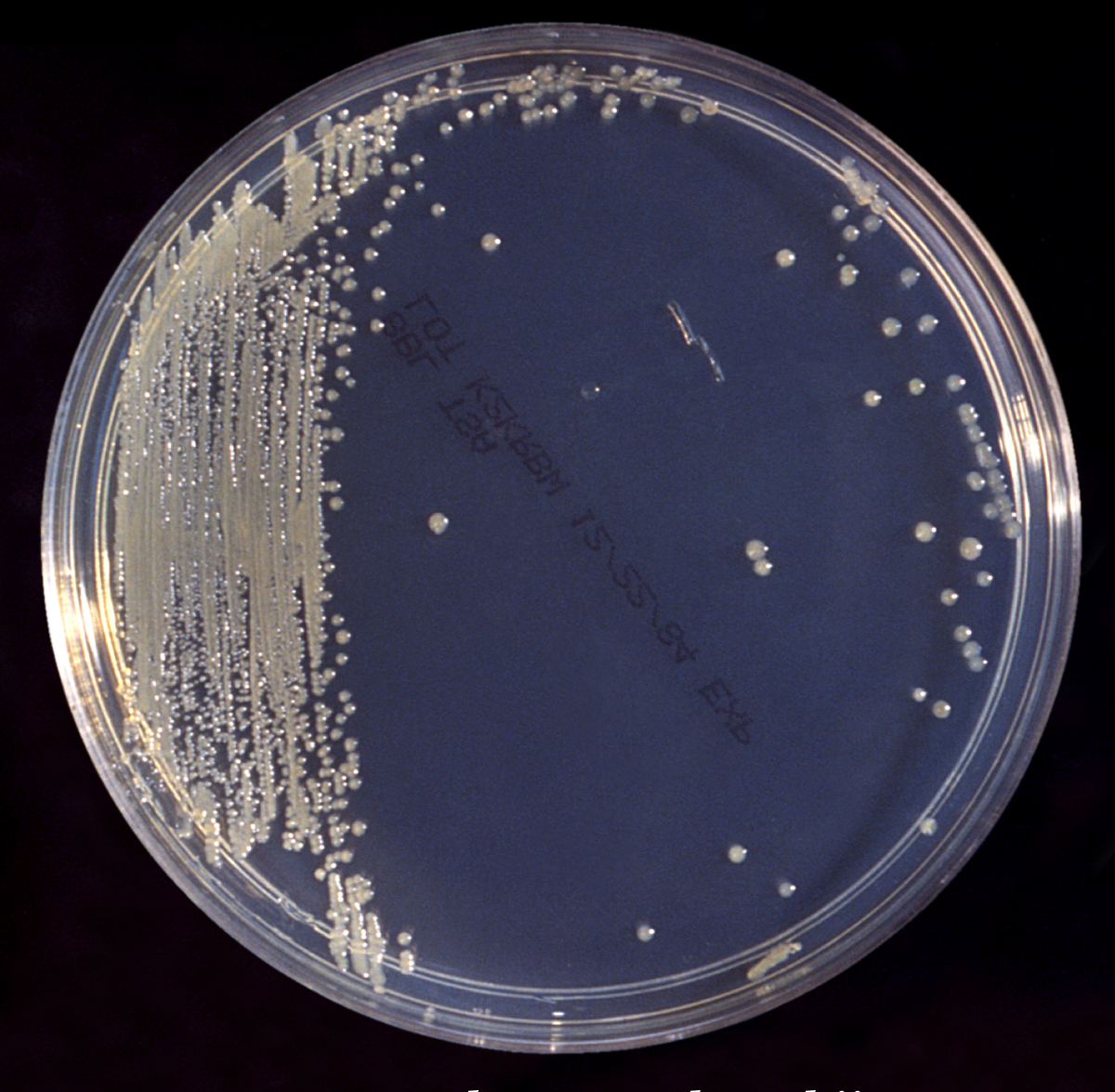
- Cronobacter sakazakii

Scientific classification
- Domain: Bacteria
- Kingdom: Pseudomonadati
- Phylum: Pseudomonadota
- Class: Gammaproteobacteria
- Order: Enterobacterales
- Family: Enterobacteriaceae
- Genus: Cronobacter (Iversen et al. 2008) (Joseph et al. 2011)

Species
- C. sakazakii C. malonaticus C. turicensis C. muytjensii C. dublinensis C. universalis C. condimenti

= Cronobacter =

Genus of bacteria

Cronobacter is a genus of Gram-negative, facultatively anaerobic, oxidase-negative, catalase-positive, rod-shaped bacteria of the family Enterobacteriaceae. Several Cronobacter species are desiccation resistant and persistent in dry products such as powdered infant formula. They are generally motile, reduce nitrate, use citrate, hydrolyze esculin and arginine, and are positive for L-ornithine decarboxylation. Acid is produced from D-glucose, D-sucrose, D-raffinose, D-melibiose, D-cellobiose, D-mannitol, D-mannose, L-rhamnose, L-arabinose, D-trehalose, galacturonate and D-maltose. Cronobacter spp. are also generally positive for acetoin production (Voges–Proskauer test) and negative for the methyl red test, indicating 2,3-butanediol rather than mixed acid fermentation. The type species of the genus Cronobacter is Cronobacter sakazakii comb. nov.

== Clinical significance ==
All Cronobacter species, except C. condimenti, have been linked retrospectively to clinical cases of infection. While cases of infection do occur in adults, these are generally non-life-threatening, and often secondary colonization to underlying health problems. Infection in infants is associated with neonatal bacteraemia, meningitis and necrotising enterocolitis with a high case fatality rate and ongoing disablement of survivors.

Increased awareness that Cronobacter are ubiquitous environmental organisms, initiatives by the WHO and FAO, and advice on infant feeding (including safe temperatures for reconstitution of powdered infant formula, and appropriate hold times, post-reconstitution) has drastically reduced the occurrence of infection outbreaks. Additionally, the introduction of an ISO standard method for detection of these organisms has aided the infant formula industry to control their presence in manufacturing sites and products, further reducing the risk to infants. However, isolated cases can still occur, in part due to Cronobacter being ubiquitous in home environments as well.

== Taxonomy ==
Cronobacter was first proposed as a new genus in 2007 as a clarification of the taxonomic relationship of the biogroups found among strains of Enterobacter sakazakii. This proposal was validly published in 2008 with five species and three subspecies named. The genus definition was further revised in 2012 to seven named species when a name (C. universalis) was given to a group of isolates that were deemed too few in number to accurately describe during the original taxonomic work, and a single additional isolate was also named (C. condimenti). In 2013 Enterobacter helveticus, Enterobacter pulveris and Enterobacter turicensis were reclassified into the genus Cronobacter, however this was corrected in 2014 when Stephan et al. published evidence that these should be classified as Franconibacter helveticus, Franconibacter pulveris and Siccibacter turicensis respectively.

== Etymology ==
Cronobacter (Cro.no.bac'ter) is from the Greek noun Cronos (Κρόνος), one of the Titans of mythology, who swallowed each of his children as soon as they were born, and the New Latin masculine noun bacter, a rod, resulting in the N.L. masc. n. Cronobacter, a rod that can cause illness in neonates.

Cronobacter sakazakii (sak.a.zaki.ī. N.L. gen. n. sakazakii, of Sakazaki) is named in honour of the Japanese microbiologist Riichi Sakazaki (ja:坂崎利一).

Cronobacter malonaticus (mă.lō.nă.tĭ'cŭs) is from N.L. n. malonas -atis, malonate; L. suff. -icus, suffix used with the sense of belonging to; N.L. masc. adj. malonaticus, pertaining to the use of malonate. The type strain, CDC 1058-77T, was isolated from a breast abscess.

Cronobacter turicensis (tŭ.rĭ.sĕn'sĭs) is from the L. masc. adj. turicensis, pertaining to Turicum, the Latin name of Zurich, Switzerland.

Cronobacter muytjensii (mœ.tjәn.sĭ.ī), from the N.L. gen. n. muytjensii, of Muytjens, is named in honour of the Dutch microbiologist Harry Muytjens, who performed much of the early work on Enterobacter sakazakii.

Cronobacter dublinensis (dŭb.lĭn.ĕn'sĭs, from the N.L. masc. adj. dublinensis, pertains to Dublin, Ireland, the origin of the type strain.

C. dublinensis subsp. lausannensis (lô.săn.ĕn'sĭs) from the L. masc. adj. lausannensis, pertains to Lausanne, Switzerland, the origin of the type strain for this subspecies.

C. dublinensis subsp. lactaridi (lăkt.ărĭd.ī), is from the L. n. lac lactis, milk, L. adj. aridus, dried, to give N.L. gen. n. lactaridi, of a dried milk.

Cronobacter universalis (u.ni.ver.sa'lis) is L. masc. adj. universalis, of or belonging to all or universal.

Cronobacter condimenti (con.di.men'ti) is from the L. gen. n. condimenti, of spice or seasoning, as it was first isolated in part from spiced meat.

== See also ==
- List of bacterial genera named after mythological figures
