= NADH:ubiquinone oxidoreductase =

NADH:ubiquinone oxidoreductase may stand for:

- NADH dehydrogenase
- NADH:ubiquinone reductase (non-electrogenic)
