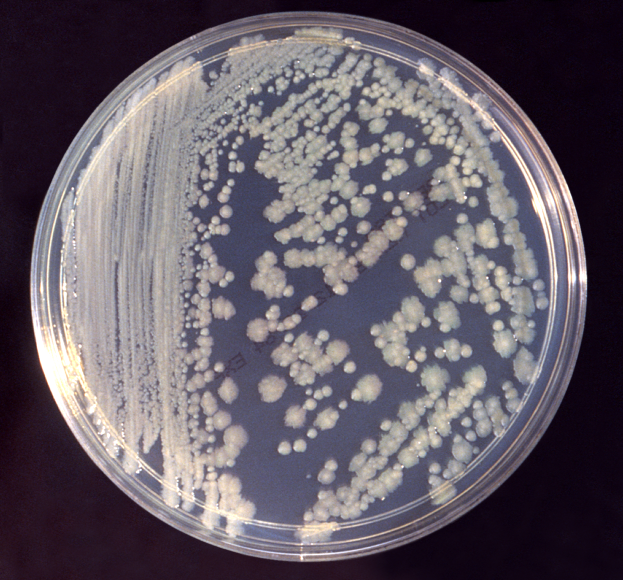
- Enterobacter cloacae on trypticase soy agar

Scientific classification
- Domain: Bacteria
- Kingdom: Pseudomonadati
- Phylum: Pseudomonadota
- Class: Gammaproteobacteria
- Order: Enterobacterales
- Family: Enterobacteriaceae
- Genus: Enterobacter; Hormaeche & Edwards 1960

Species
- E. asburiae E. bugandensis E. cancerogenus E. chengduensis E. chinensis E. chuandaensis E. cloacae E. dykesii E. hormaechei E. huaxiensis E. intestinihominis E. kobei E. ludwigii E. mori E. nematophilus E. oligotrophicus E. pasteurii E. pseudoroggenkampii E. quasihormaechei E. quasimori E. quasiroggenkampii E. roggenkampii E. rongchengensis E. siamensis E. sichuanensis E. soli E. vonholyi E. wuhouensis

Synonyms
- Cloaca Castellani & Chalmers, 1919; Aerobacter Hormaeche & Edwards, 1958

= Enterobacter =

Genus of bacteria

Enterobacter is a genus of Gram-negative, facultatively anaerobic, rod-shaped, non-spore-forming bacteria in the family Enterobacteriaceae. Enterobacter spp. are found in soil, water, sewage, feces and gut environments. It is the type genus of the order Enterobacterales. Several strains of these bacteria are pathogenic and cause opportunistic infections in immunocompromised (usually hospitalized) hosts and in those who are on mechanical ventilation. The urinary and respiratory tracts are the most common sites of infection. The genus Enterobacter is a member of the coliform group of bacteria. It does not belong to the fecal coliforms (or thermotolerant coliforms) group of bacteria, unlike Escherichia coli, because it is incapable of growth at 44.5 °C in the presence of bile salts. Some of them show quorum sensing properties.

One clinically important species from this genus is E. cloacae.

In 2018, researchers detected five strains of Enterobacter bugandensis aboard the International Space Station (ISS) (none pathogenic to humans) and concluded that microbial populations on the ISS should be closely monitored to ensure a medically safe environment for astronauts.

== Biochemical characteristics ==
The genus Enterobacter ferments lactose with gas production during a 48-hour incubation at 35-37 °C in the presence of bile salts and detergents. It is oxidase-negative, indole-negative, and urease-variable.

== Virulence characteristics ==
For Enterobacter species, flagella are used for adhesion, biofilm formation, and protein export as well as motility.

The lipopolysaccharide capsule of Enterobacter spp. helps members of this genus avoid phagocytosis and initiate the host inflammatory response.

== Symptoms ==
Pathogenic strains of Enterobacter spp. have been found in the sputum, blood, wounds, and stool of humans. Enterobacter spp. are associated with common nosocomial infections including respiratory, endocarditis, bacteremia, urinary tract infections, osteomyelitis, among others. Enterobacter-associated bacteremia presents as fever but can progress to systemic inflammatory response syndrome and shock. For pneumonia caused by Enterobacter spp., symptoms include coughing and shortness of breath.

== Treatment ==
Treatment is dependent on local trends of antibiotic resistance. Enterobacter huaxiensis and Enterobacter chuandaensis are two recently discovered species that exhibit especially antibiotic resistant characteristics.

Cefepime, a fourth-generation cephalosporin from the β-Lactam antibiotic class. Imipenem (a carbapenem) is often the antibiotic of choice. Aminoglycosides such as amikacin have been found to be very effective, as well. Quinolones can be an effective alternative.

== Linked to obesity ==
A 2012 study has shown that the presence of Enterobacter cloacae B29 in the gut of a morbidly obese individual may have contributed to the patient's obesity. Reduction of the bacterial load within the patient's gut, from 35% E. cloacae B29 to non-detectable levels, was associated with a parallel reduction in endotoxin load in the patient and a concomitant, significant reduction in weight. Furthermore, the same bacterial strain, isolated from the patient, induced obesity and insulin resistance in germfree C57BL/6J mice that were being fed a high-fat diet. The study concludes that E. cloacae B29 may contribute to obesity in its human hosts through an endotoxin-induced, inflammation-mediated mechanism.
