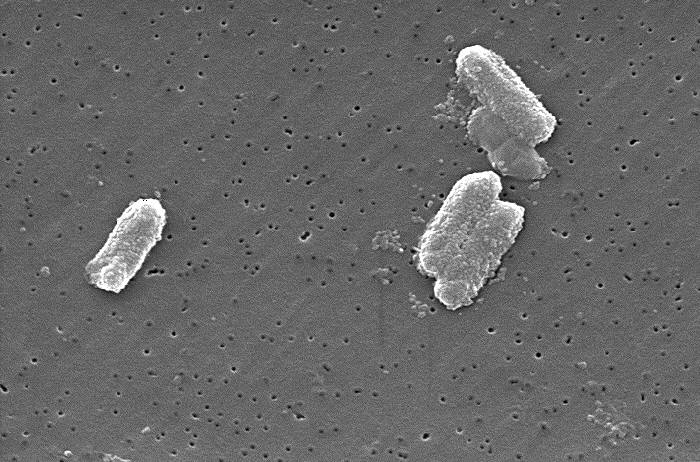
- Citrobacter freundii, one member of the family

Scientific classification
- Domain: Bacteria
- Kingdom: Pseudomonadati
- Phylum: Pseudomonadota
- Class: Gammaproteobacteria
- Order: Enterobacterales
- Family: Enterobacteriaceae; Rahn, 1937

Genera
- See text

= Enterobacteriaceae =

Family of bacteria

Enterobacteriaceae is a large family of Gram-negative bacteria. It includes over 30 genera and more than 100 species. Its classification above the level of family is still a subject of debate, but one classification places it in the order Enterobacterales of the class Gammaproteobacteria in the phylum Pseudomonadota. In 2016, the description and members of this family were emended based on comparative genomic analyses by Adeolu et al.

Enterobacteriaceae includes, along with many harmless symbionts, many of the more familiar bacterial pathogens, such as Salmonella, Escherichia coli, Klebsiella, and Shigella. Other disease-causing bacteria in this family include Enterobacter and Citrobacter. Members of the Enterobacteriaceae can be trivially referred to as enterobacteria or "enteric bacteria", as several members live in the intestines of animals. In fact, the etymology of the family is enterobacterium with the suffix to designate a family (aceae)—not after the genus Enterobacter (which would be "Enterobacteraceae")—and the type genus is Escherichia.

== Morphology ==
Members of the Enterobacteriaceae are bacilli (rod-shaped), and are typically 1–5 μm in length. They typically appear as medium to large-sized grey colonies on blood agar, although some can express pigments.

Most have many flagella used to move about, but a few genera are nonmotile. Most members of Enterobacteriaceae have peritrichous, type I fimbriae involved in the adhesion of the bacterial cells to their hosts.

They are not spore-forming.

== Metabolism ==
Like other Pseudomonadota, Enterobacteriaceae have gram-negative stains, and they are facultative anaerobes, some fermenting sugars to produce lactic acid and various other end products. Most also reduce nitrate to nitrite, although exceptions exist. Unlike most similar bacteria, Enterobacteriaceae generally lack cytochrome c oxidase, there are exceptions.

Catalase reactions vary among Enterobacteriaceae.

== Ecology ==
Many members of this family are normal members of the gut microbiota in humans and other animals, while others are found in water or soil, or are parasites on a variety of different animals and plants.

== Model organisms and medical relevance ==
Escherichia coli is one of the most important model organisms, and its genetics and biochemistry have been closely studied.

Some enterobacteria are important pathogens, e.g. Salmonella, or Shigella e.g. because they produce endotoxins. Endotoxins reside in the cell wall and are released when the cell dies and the cell wall disintegrates. Some members of the Enterobacteriaceae produce endotoxins that, when released into the bloodstream following cell lysis, cause a systemic inflammatory and vasodilatory response. The most severe form of this is known as endotoxic shock, which can be rapidly fatal.

== Historical systematics and taxonomy ==
Enterobacteriaceae was originally the sole family under the order Enterobacteriales. The family contained a large array of biochemically distinct species with different ecological niches, which made biochemical descriptions difficult. The original classification of species to this family and order was largely based on 16S rRNA genome sequence analyses, which is known to have low discriminatory power and the results of which changes depends on the algorithm and organism information used. Despite this, the analyses still exhibited polyphyletic branching, indicating the presence of distinct subgroups within the family.

In 2016, the order Enterobacteriales was renamed to Enterobacterales, and divided into 7 new families, including the emended Enterobacteriaceae family. This emendation restricted the family to include only those genera directly related to the type genus, which included most of the enteric species under the order. This classification was proposed based on the construction of several robust phylogenetic trees using conserved genome sequences, 16S rRNA sequences and multilocus sequence analyses. Molecular markers, specifically conserved signature indels, specific to this family were identified as evidence supporting the division independent of phylogenetic trees.

In 2017, a subsequent study using comparative phylogenomic analyses identified the presence of 6 subfamily level clades within the family Enterobacteriaceae, namely the "Escherichia clade", "Klebsiella clade", "Enterobacter clade", "Kosakonia clade", "Cronobacter clade", "Cedecea clade" and an "Enterobacteriaceae incertae sedis clade" containing species whose taxonomic placement within the family is unclear. However, this division was not officially proposed as the subfamily rank is generally not used.

== Molecular signatures ==
Analyses of genome sequences from Enterobacteriaceae species identified 21 conserved signature indels (CSIs) that are uniquely present in this family in the proteins NADH:ubiquinone oxidoreductase (subunit M), twitching motility protein PilT, 2,3-dihydroxybenzoate-AMP ligase, ATP/GTP-binding protein, multifunctional fatty acid oxidation complex (subunit alpha), S-formylglutathione hydrolase, aspartate-semialdehyde dehydrogenase, epimerase, membrane protein, formate dehydrogenylase (subunit 7), glutathione S-transferase, major facilitator superfamily transporter, phosphoglucosamine mutase, glycosyl hydrolase 1 family protein, 23S rrna [uracil(1939)-C(5)]-methyltransferase, co-chaperone HscB, N-acetylmuramoyl-L-alanine amidase, sulfate ABC transporter ATP-binding protein CysA, and LPS assembly protein LptD. These CSIs provide a molecular means of distinguishing Enterobacteriaceae from other families within the order Enterobacterales and other bacteria.

== Genera ==
=== Validly published genera ===
The following genera have been validly published, thus they have "Standing in Nomenclature". The year the genus was proposed is listed in parentheses after the genus name.

- Apirhabdus (2024)
- Buttiauxella (1982)
- Cedecea (1981)
- Citrobacter (1932)
- Cronobacter (2008)
- Dryocola (2023)
- Edaphovirga (2025)
- Enterobacillus (2015)
- Enterobacter (1960)
- Escherichia (1919)
- Franconibacter (2014)
- Gibbsiella (2011)
- Huaxiibacter (2022)
- Intestinirhabdus (2020)
- Izhakiella (2016)
- Jejuibacter (2025)
- Klebsiella (1885)
- Kluyvera (1981)
- Kosakonia (2013)
- Leclercia (1987)
- Lelliottia (2013)
- Limnobaculum (2018)
- Mangrovibacter (2010)
- Metakosakonia (2017)
- Phytobacter (2017)
- Pluralibacter (2013)
- Pseudescherichia (2017)
- Pseudocitrobacter (2014)
- Rosenbergiella (2013)
- Saccharobacter (1990)
- Salmonella (1900)
- Scandinavium (2020)
- Shigella (1919)
- Shimwellia (2010)
- Siccibacter (2014)
- Silvania (2023)
- Superficieibacter (2025)
- Tenebrionibacter (2022)
- Tenebrionicola (2022)
- Trabulsiella (1992)
- Yokenella (1985)

=== Candidatus genera ===
- "Candidatus Annandia"
- "Candidatus Arocatia"
- "Candidatus Aschnera"
- "Candidatus Benitsuchiphilus"
- "Candidatus Blochmannia"
- "Candidatus Curculioniphilus"
- "Candidatus Cuticobacterium"
- "Candidatus Doolittlea"
- "Candidatus Gillettellia"
- "Candidatus Gullanella"
- "Candidatus Hamiltonella"
- "Candidatus Hartigia"
- "Candidatus Hoaglandella"
- "Candidatus Ischnodemia"
- "Candidatus Ishikawaella"
- "Candidatus Kleidoceria"
- "Candidatus Kotejella"
- "Candidatus Macropleicola"
- "Candidatus Mikella"
- "Candidatus Moranella"
- "Candidatus Phlomobacter"
- "Candidatus Profftia"
- "Candidatus Purcelliella"
- "Candidatus Regiella"
- "Candidatus Riesia"
- "Candidatus Rohrkolberia"
- "Candidatus Rosenkranzia"
- "Candidatus Schneideria"
- "Candidatus Stammera"
- "Candidatus Stammerula"
- "Candidatus Tachikawaea"
- "Candidatus Westeberhardia"

=== Proposed genera ===
The following genera have been effectively, but not validly, published, thus they do not have "Standing in Nomenclature". The year the genus was proposed is listed in parentheses after the genus name.

- Aquamonas (2009)
- Atlantibacter (2016)
- Superficieibacter (2018)

== Identification ==
To identify different genera of Enterobacteriaceae, a microbiologist may run a series of tests in the lab. These include:

- Phenol red
- Tryptone broth
- Phenylalanine agar for detection of production of deaminase, which converts phenylalanine to phenylpyruvic acid
- Methyl red or Voges-Proskauer tests depend on the digestion of glucose. The methyl red tests for acid endproducts. The Voges Proskauer tests for the production of acetylmethylcarbinol.
- Catalase test on nutrient agar tests for the production of enzyme catalase, which splits hydrogen peroxide and releases oxygen gas.
- Oxidase test on nutrient agar tests for the production of the enzyme oxidase, which reacts with an aromatic amine to produce a purple color.
- Nutrient gelatin tests to detect activity of the enzyme gelatinase.

In a clinical setting, three species make up 80 to 95% of all isolates identified. These are Escherichia coli, Klebsiella pneumoniae, and Proteus mirabilis. However, Proteus mirabilis is now considered a part of the Morganellaceae, a sister clade within the Enterobacterales.

== Antibiotic resistance ==
Several Enterobacteriaceae strains have been isolated which are resistant to antibiotics including carbapenems, which are often claimed as "the last line of antibiotic defense" against resistant organisms. For instance, some Klebsiella pneumoniae strains are carbapenem resistant. Various carbapenemases genes (blaOXA-48, OXA-23, blaKPC and blaNDM-1, blaVIM and blaIMP) have been identified in carbapenem resistant Enterobacteriaceae including Escherichia coli and Klebsiella pneumoniae.
