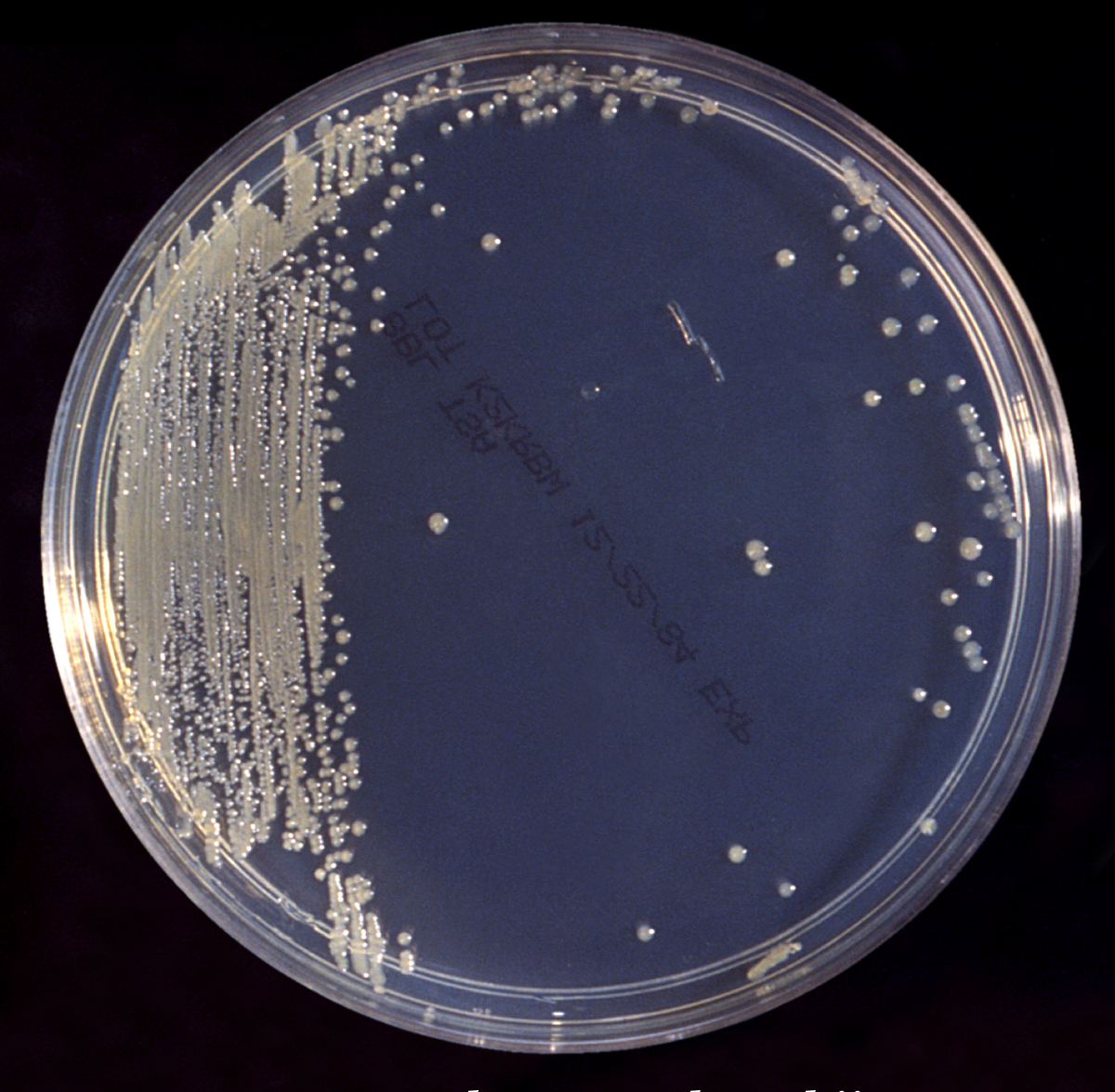
- Enterobacter, the type genus of the order

Scientific classification
- Domain: Bacteria
- Kingdom: Pseudomonadati
- Phylum: Pseudomonadota
- Class: Gammaproteobacteria
- Order: Enterobacterales; Adeolu et al., 2016

Families
- Budviciaceae; Enterobacteriaceae; Erwiniaceae; Gallaecimonadaceae; Hafniaceae; Morganellaceae; Pectobacteriaceae; Yersiniaceae; Genera incertae sedis; Aranicola; Averyella; Grimontella; Guhaiyinggella; Margalefia; Phytobacter; Plesiomonas; Tiedjeia

Synonyms
- Enterobacteriales

= Enterobacterales =

Order of gram-negative bacteria

Enterobacterales is an order of Gram-negative, non-spore forming, facultatively anaerobic, rod-shaped bacteria with the class Gammaproteobacteria. The type genus of this order is Enterobacter.

The name Enterobacterales is derived from the Latin term Enterobacter, referring the type genus of the order and the suffix "-ales", an ending used to denote an order. Together, Enterobacterales refers to an order whose nomenclatural type is the genus Enterobacter.

== Historical Identification and Systematics ==
Enterobacterales was proposed in 2005 under the name "Enterobacteriales". However, the name "Enterobacteriales" was not validated according to the rules of the International Code of Nomenclature of Prokaryotes, thus it lacked standing in nomenclature, so the name was written in parentheses. "Enterobacteriales" was a monotypic order, containing only the family Enterobacteriaceae, and shared its type genus Escherichia. The order contained a large, diverse group of species, occupying distinct ecological niches and possessing a variety of biochemical characteristics. Many genera within the order have significant impacts on human activity, such as the pathogenic species Escherichia coli, Salmonella enterica, and Yersinia pestis, as well as agriculture-harming phytopathogens such as members of the genera Dickeya, Pectobacterium, Brenneria, Erwinia and Pantoea. The large number of species as well as the range of different biochemical characteristics made describing the order and its subgroups extremely difficult. The assignment and classification of this order was largely based on 16S rRNA genome sequences, which is known to have low discriminatory power and yield different results depending on the algorithm and organism strain used. In addition, these analyses have shown that 'Enterobacteriales' exhibited polyphyletic branching, with distinct subgroups.

In 2016, "Enterobacteriales" was proposed to be reclassified as Enterobacterales, and the type genus changed to Enterobacter in accordance with the International Code of Nomenclature of Prokaryotes. In addition, several new families within the order Enterobacterales were proposed, consisting of species that were formerly members of the family Enterobacteriaceae based on groupings found in phylogenetic trees constructed based on conserved genomes, 16S rRNA sequences and multi-locus sequence analysis as well as independent molecular markers (conserved signature indels).

As of 2021, the order Enterobacterales contains 7 validly published families (Budviciaceae, Enterobacteriaceae, Erwiniaceae, Hafniaceae, Morganellaceae, Pectobacteriaceae and Yersiniaceae).

== Molecular Signatures ==
Analyses of genome sequences from Enterobacterales species identified five conserved signature indels (CSIs) for this order in the proteins peptide ABC transporter permease, elongation factor P-like protein YeiP, L-arabinose isomerase, pyrophosphatase, and a hypothetical protein, which in most cases are exclusively shared by either all or most members of this order. These CSIs provide a molecular means of demarcating this order from other Gammaproteobacteria and supports the monophyletic nature of the order Enterobacterales.

== Genera ==
Phylogeny of Enterobacterales

- Pasteurellales (outgroup)
- Enterobacterales
  - Budviciaceae
  - - Morganellaceae
    - - Hafniaceae
      - - Yersiniaceae
        - - Pectobacteriaceae
          - - Erwiniaceae
            - Enterobacteriaceae

Phylogeny of the Enterobacterales as proposed in 2016. Pasteurellales is used as the outgroup.

=== Validly published genera ===
The following genera have been validly published, thus they have "Standing in Nomenclature". The year the genus was proposed is listed in parentheses after the genus name.

- Arsenophonus (1991)
- Biostraticola (2008)
- Brenneria (1999)
- Buchnera (1991)
- Budvicia (1985)
- Buttiauxella (1982)
- Cedecea (1981)
- Chania (2016)
- Citrobacter (1932)
- Cosenzaea (2011)
- Cronobacter (2008)
- Dickeya (2005)
- Edwardsiella (1965)
- Enterobacillus (2015)
- Enterobacter (1960)
- Erwinia (1920)
- Escherichia (1919)
- Ewingella (1984)
- Franconibacter (2014)
- Gibbsiella (2011)
- Hafnia (1954)
- Izhakiella (2016)
- Klebsiella (1885)
- Kluyvera (1981)
- Kosakonia (2013)
- Leclercia (1987)
- Lelliottia (2013)
- Leminorella (1985)
- Limnobaculum (2018)
- Lonsdalea (2012)
- Mangrovibacter (2010)
- Metakosakonia (2017)
- Mixta (2018)
- Moellerella (1984)
- Morganella (1943)
- Obesumbacterium (1963)
- Pantoea (1989)
- Pectobacterium (1945)
- Phaseolibacter (2013)
- Photorhabdus (1993)
- Phytobacter (2017)
- Plesiomonas (1962)
- Pluralibacter (2013)
- Pragia (1988)
- Proteus (1885)
- Providencia (1962)
- Pseudescherichia (2017)
- Pseudocitrobacter (2014)
- Rahnella (1981)
- Raoultella (2001)
- Rosenbergiella (2013)
- Rouxiella (2015)
- Saccharobacter (1990)
- Salmonella (1990)
- Samsonia (2001)
- Scandinavium (2020)
- Serratia (1823)
- Shigella (1919)
- Shimwellia (2010)
- Siccibacter (2014)
- Sodalis (1999)
- Superficieibacter (2018)
- Tatumella (1982)
- Trabulsiella (1992)
- Wigglesworthia (1995)
- Xenorhabdus (1979)
- Yersinia (1944)
- Yokenella (1985)

=== Candidatus genera ===
- "Candidatus Annandia"
- "Candidatus Arocatia"
- "Candidatus Aschnera"
- "Candidatus Benitsuchiphilus"
- "Candidatus Blochmannia"
- "Candidatus Curculioniphilus"
- "Candidatus Cuticobacterium"
- "Candidatus Doolittlea"
- "Candidatus Fukatsuia"
- "Candidatus Gillettellia"
- "Candidatus Gullanella"
- "Candidatus Hamiltonella"
- "Candidatus Hartigia"
- "Candidatus Hoaglandella"
- "Candidatus Ischnodemia"
- "Candidatus Ishikawaella"
- "Candidatus Kleidoceria"
- "Candidatus Kotejella"
- "Candidatus Macropleicola"
- "Candidatus Mikella"
- "Candidatus Moranella"
- "Candidatus Phlomobacter"
- "Candidatus Profftia"
- "Candidatus Purcelliella"
- "Candidatus Regiella"
- "Candidatus Riesia"
- "Candidatus Rohrkolberia"
- "Candidatus Rosenkranzia"
- "Candidatus Schneideria"
- "Candidatus Stammera"
- "Candidatus Stammerula"
- "Candidatus Tachikawaea"
- "Candidatus Westeberhardia"

=== Proposed, but have not obtained standing in nomenclature ===
- Aquamonas (2009)
- Aranicola (1997)
- Atlantibacter (2016)
- Averyella (2005)
- Grimontella (2003)
- Guhaiyinggella (1995)
- Margalefia (2004)
- Tiedjeia (2005)
