= Soll =

Soll may refer to:

== People ==
- Beth Soll, American dancer
- Britta Soll, Estonian actress and model
- David R. Soll, American microbiologist
- Dieter Söll, German scientist in the United States
- Ivan Soll, American philosopher
- Jacob Soll, American professor of philosophy, history and accounting
- Rick Soll, a Chicago Tribune journalist

== Places ==
- Söll, Austria
- Washington and Elizabeth Miller Tract-Center-Soll Community Historic District, Des Moines, Iowa, United States
