= Adoration of the Shepherds with a Donor =

Painting by Palma Vecchio

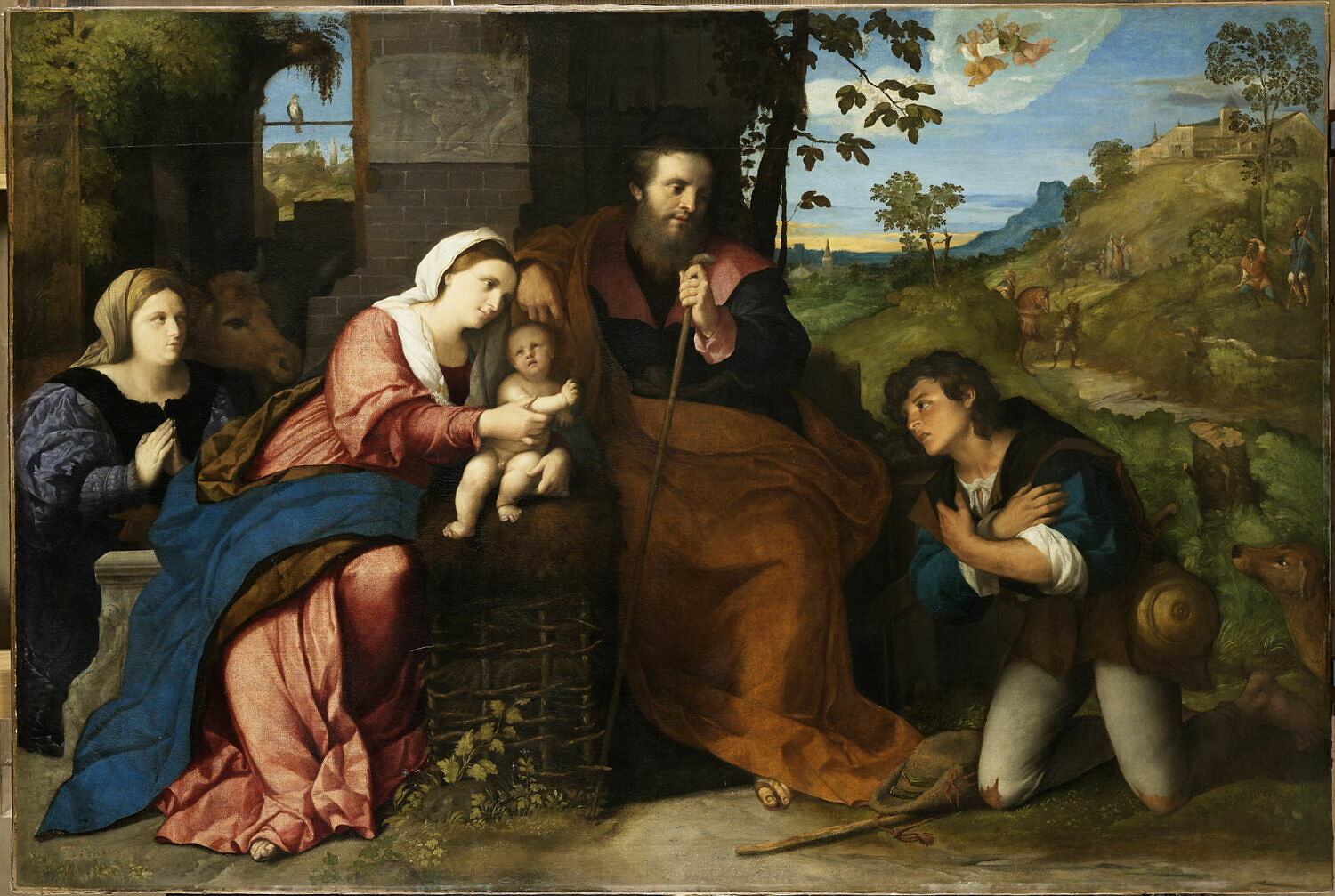
Adoration of the Shepherds with a Donor (c. 1520–1525) by Palma Vecchio

Adoration of the Shepherds with a Donor is an oil painting on canvas executed c.1520–1525 by the Venetian painter Palma Vecchio, now in room 711 of the Louvre in Paris.

Its original location and the identity of its commissioner (shown kneeling to the right) are both unknown, though it was recorded as being owned in 1669 by Abraham Nicolas Amelot de la Houssaye, secretary to the French ambassador to Venice in the second half of the 17th century. It was next owned by the painter Antoine Benoist, who misattributed it to Titian. It was then acquired from him in 1685 by Louis XIV and kept at the Palace of Versailles before being seized upon the French Revolution.

The painting depicts the classic holy family inserted in an external environment and near an animal shelter where the ox of the Christmas story is depicted. At the top left, under an arch, a lark is painted, symbolically a messenger of rebirth. The Titianesque character of the figures and the drapery is typical of Palma's late work and suggests a date c. 1520–1525 for the painting.

== In popular culture ==
The painting appeared in the fourth episode of the second season of the Interview with the Vampire television series. In the episode, Louis De Pointe du Lac and Armand visit the Louvre and Armand claims to have been the model for the kneeling boy and confesses his past life as a human in Venice.

== Bibliography ==
- Giovanni Mariacher, 'Palma il Vecchio', in I pittori bergamaschi-Il Cinquecento, I, Bergamo, Poligrafiche Bolis, 1975, p. 212.
