= Frank Odds =

English mycologist (1945–2020)

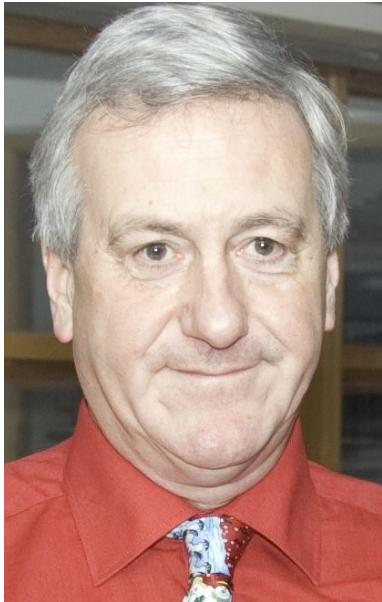
- Born: 29 August 1945
- Died: 7 July 2020 (aged 74)
- Education: University of Leeds

Frank C. Odds (29 August 1945 – 7 July 2020) was an English mycologist. He studied Candida albicans, establishing how modern researchers study fungal pathogens and the diseases they cause.

== Early life and education ==
Frank C. Odds was born in Devon, England on 29 August 1945. He studied biochemistry and obtained his undergraduate degree and PhD at the University of Leeds. From 1970 to 1972, Odds was a visiting Fellow at the Center for Disease Control (CDC). Returning to the United Kingdom in 1972, Odds accepted a postdoctoral fellowship position back at the University of Leeds until 1975. Odds experienced his first faculty role at the University of Leicester as a lecturer and senior lecture in Medical Microbiology until 1989. After his time at the University of Leicester, Odds became the Director of Bacteriology & Mycology of the Janssen Research Foundation until 1999. His final academic role was Professor of Medical Mycology at the University of Aberdeen before retiring in 2009. Odds died 7 July 2020.

== Research ==
Before DNA typing methods replaced the phenotypic approach, Odds created a method for biotyping Candida albicans and it became adopted internationally in many labs. Odds also used Multi-Locus Sequence Typing (MLST) to determine the population structure of Candida albicans and other Candida species which allowed for virulence factors to be explored across different phylogenetic groups. His breakthrough in MLST allowed Odds to serve as the curator of the Candida MLST for years. During this time, two new Candida species were discovered. The efforts of Odds allowed for further understanding of the cellular and molecular basis of the development of cell shape in C. albicans as well as help publish the first sequence of a Candida protease gene. Odds also helped invent an infection model that promoted rapid evaluation of the relative virulence or Candida strains and mutants.

During Odds' time as the Director of Bacteriology & Mycology at the Janssen Research Foundation, his efforts helped develop azole and triazole antifungals. Odds had 18 patents to his name and he served as the chief coordinator on the reports of clinical trials, case reports of antifungal agents, and copious international studies.

Before his death in 2020, Odds helped establish the Aberdeen Fungal Group which has gone on to become a presence in medical mycology, be part of cross-institutional collaborations around the United Kingdom, help train researchers in low income countries, and be awarded the Medical Research Council (MRC) MRC Centre status for Medical Mycology.

== Community roles and honors ==
Odds held many community roles throughout his life, including:

- President of the International Society for Human and Animal Mycology
- President of the European Confederation of Medical Mycology
- Honorary Secretary and President of the British Society for Medical Mycology
- Chair of the Medical Mycology Division F of the American Society for Microbiology
- Co-chair and Chair of the Wellcome Trust Immunology and Infectious Disease grant panel
- Chief Editor of Current Topics in Medical Mycology
- Editor in Chief of the ISHAM journals: Journal of Medical and Veterinary Mycology

He also received the following awards and honors:

- Fellowship of the Royal Society of Edinburgh
- Fellowship of the American Academy of Microbiology
- Honorary Membership of the British and International Medical Mycology societies
- ISHAM award and medal
- Maxwell L. Littman Award from the New York Medical Mycology Society
- Pfizer Award in Biology
- MRCPath and FRCPath for clinical expertise

== Notable publications ==
Odds published more than 500 journal articles, including:

- Odds, Frank C. Candida and candidosis: a review and bibliography. Bailliere Tindall, 1988.
- Shahana S, Childers DS, Ballou ER, Bohvych I, Odds FC, Gow NA, Brown AJ. New Clox Systems for rapid and efficient gene disruption in Candida albicans. Plus One. 9: e100390. PMID 24940603 DOI: 10.1371/Journal.Pone.0100390
- Bates S, Hall RA, Cheetham J, Netea MG, MacCallum DM, Brown AJ, Odds FC, Gow NA. Role of the Candida albicans MNN1 gene family in cell wall structure and virulence. Bmc Research Notes. 6: 294. PMID 23886038 DOI: 10.1186/1756-0500-6-294
- Shahana S, Mora-Montes HM, Castillo L, Bohovych I, Sheth CC, Odds FC, Gow NA, Brown AJ. Reporters for the analysis of N-glycosylation in Candida albicans. Fungal Genetics and Biology : Fg & B. 56: 107–15. PMID 23608318DOI: 10.1016/J.Fgb.2013.03.009
- Gazvani R, Fowler PA, Coyne L, Odds FC, Gow NAR. Does Candida albicans play a role in the etiology of endometriosis? Journal of Endometriosis and Pelvic Pain Disorders. 5: 2–9. DOI: 10.5301/Je.2013.10919
- Lee KK, Maccallum DM, Jacobsen MD, Walker LA, Odds FC, Gow NA, Munro CA. Elevated cell wall chitin in Candida albicans confers echinocandin resistance in vivo. Antimicrobial Agents and Chemotherapy. 56: 208–17. PMID 21986821DOI: 10.1128/Aac.00683-11
- Ostrosky-Zeichner L, Casadevall A, Galgiani JN, Odds FC, Rex JH. An insight into the antifungal pipeline: selected new molecules and beyond. Nature Reviews. Drug Discovery. 9: 719–27. PMID 20725094 DOI: 10.1038/Nrd3074
- Mora-Montes HM, Bates S, Netea MG, Castillo L, Brand A, Buurman ET, Díaz-JimÃ©nez DF, Jan Kullberg B, Brown AJ, Odds FC, Gow NA. A multifunctional mannosyltransferase family in Candida albicans determines cell wall mannan structure and host-fungus interactions. The Journal of Biological Chemistry. 285: 12087–95. PMID 20164191 DOI: 10.1074/Jbc.M109.081513
- Odds FC. Editorial: Resistance to antifungal agents. Fungal Genetics and Biology : Fg & B. 47: 190. PMID 20026235DOI: 10.1016/J.Fgb.2009.12.005
- Odds FC. Molecular phylogenetics and epidemiology of Candida albicans. Future Microbiology. 5: 67–79. PMID 20020830 DOI: 10.2217/fmb.09.113
- Odds FC. In Candida albicans, resistance to flucytosine and terbinafine is linked to MAT locus homozygosity and multilocus sequence typing clade 1. Fems Yeast Research. 9: 1091–101. PMID 19799637 DOI: 10.1111/J.1567-1364.2009.00577.X
- MacCallum DM, Castillo L, Nather K, Munro CA, Brown AJ, Gow NA, Odds FC. Property differences among the four major Candida albicans strain clades. Eukaryotic Cell. 8: 373–87. PMID 19151328 DOI: 10.1128/Ec.00387-08
- Odds FC. Secreted proteinases and Candida albicans virulence. Microbiology. 154: 3245–6. PMID 18957578 DOI: 10.1099/Mic.0.2008/023671-0
