= CPVL =

Protein-coding gene in humans

Identifiers
- Aliases: CPVL, HVLP, carboxypeptidase, vitellogenic like, carboxypeptidase vitellogenic like
- External IDs: OMIM: 609780; MGI: 1918537; GeneCards: CPVL

Gene location (Human)
Chr.	Chromosome 7 (human)
Band	7p14.3	Start	28,995,235 bp
Band	7p14.3	End	29,195,451 bp

Gene location (Mouse)
Chr.	Chromosome 6 (mouse)
Band	6|6 B3	Start	53,850,264 bp
Band	6|6 B3	End	53,955,656 bp
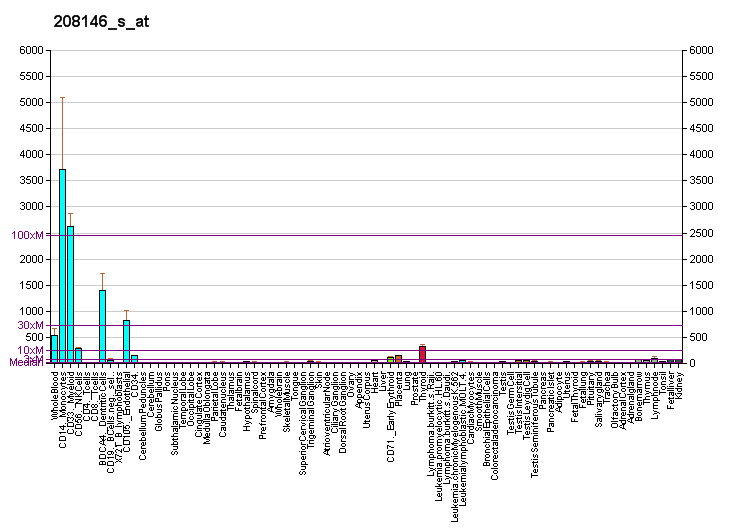
RNA expression pattern
Bgee	Human / Mouse (ortholog); Top expressed in: monocyte; granulocyte; spleen; renal medulla; left lobe of thyroid gland; gonad; right lobe of thyroid gland; apex of heart; left ventricle; blood / Top expressed in: spermatid; secondary oocyte; seminiferous tubule; zygote; primary oocyte; embryo; spermatocyte; embryo; vastus lateralis muscle; jejunum; More reference expression data
BioGPS	More reference expression data
Gene ontology
Molecular function	carboxypeptidase activity; peptidase activity; hydrolase activity; serine-type carboxypeptidase activity
Cellular component	extracellular exosome
Biological process	proteolysis involved in cellular protein catabolic process; proteolysis
Sources:Amigo / QuickGO
Orthologs
Databases	NCBI: entry; OMA: entry
Species	Human	Mouse
Entrez	54504	71287
Ensembl	ENSG00000106066	ENSMUSG00000052955
UniProt	Q9H3G5	Q9D3S9
RefSeq (mRNA)	NM_019029; NM_031311; NM_001348052; NM_001348054	NM_001289713; NM_001289714; NM_027749
RefSeq (protein)	NP_061902; NP_112601; NP_001334981; NP_001334983; NP_001358184 NP_001358185; NP_001358186; NP_001358187; NP_001358189; NP_001358190; NP_001358191; NP_001358192; NP_001358193; NP_001358194; NP_001358195; NP_001358196; NP_001358197	NP_001276642; NP_001276643; NP_082025
Location (UCSC)	Chr 7: 29 – 29.2 Mb	Chr 6: 53.85 – 53.96 Mb
PubMed search
- Wikidata
View/Edit Human	View/Edit Mouse

Probable serine carboxypeptidase CPVL is an enzyme that in humans is encoded by the CPVL gene. The "CPVL" gene is expressed mainly in monocytes and macrophages, and it is located in the endoplasmatic reticulum and in the endosomal/lysosomal compartment. The distribution of CPVL suggests that the enzyme may be involved in antigen processing and the secretory pathway. Besides those macrophages-rich tissues, the heart and kidney also express high levels of CPVL mRNA.The enzyme is similar to the carboxypeptidases CATHA and SCPEP1, but no direct confirmation of the enzymatic activity was obtained so far. The exact function of this protein, however, has not been determined.

== Structure ==
=== Gene ===
"CPVL" gene is located at chromosome 7p15.1, consisting of 14 exons. At least two alternatively spliced transcripts which encode the same protein have been observed.

=== Protein ===
The designation of CPVL is a true serine carboxypeptidase. Although the primary sequence displays the expected serine carboxypeptidase active site, the enzymatic activity remains to be demonstrated. The primary sequence of CPVL contains a putative signal sequence, four potential N-linked glycosylation sites and four myristoylation sites, but no transmembrane domain, suggesting that it may be luminal in an organelle and/or involved in the secretory pathway.

== Function ==
Although the primary sequence of CPVL bears every hallmarks of a serine carboxypeptidase, the enzymatic function of CPVL has not been confirmed. On the basis of its localization, CPVL is postulated to play a role in the biosynthesis of secretory molecules or in the processing and transport of peptides for loading onto MHC I molecules, or in MHC II-dependent APC functions. The high-level expression of CPVL mRNA in heart and kidney implies that CPVL may also have extra immune functions, such as regulation of cardiovascular homeostasis.

== Clinical significance ==
The deletion of this gene has been reported associated with Wilms tumor. GWAS show that genetic variations of the CPVL gene are associated with susceptibility to diabetic nephropathy in European Americans, Japanese and Chinese. CPVL is also reported to be one of the four down-regulated proteins which is related to severity of inflammation, and it may be a potential biomarker for identification of infection and prediction of outcome.
