= YopE protein domain =

YopE
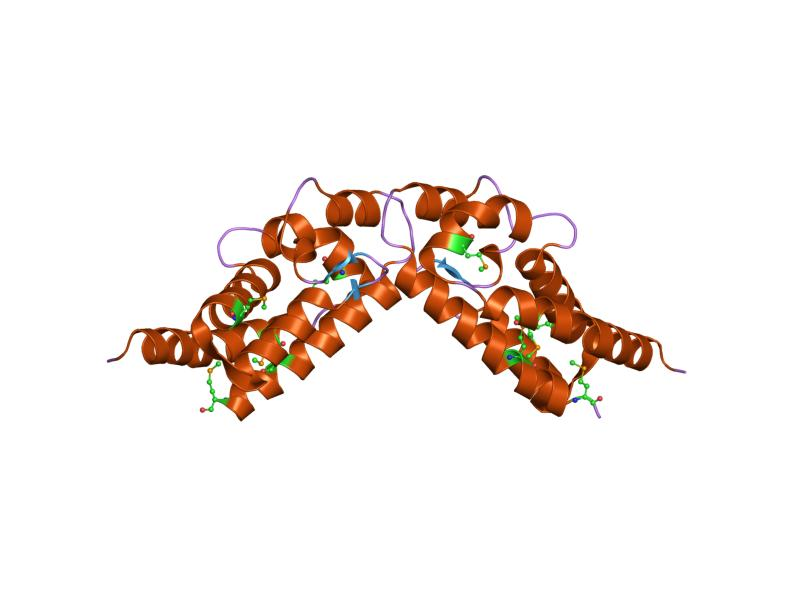
- crystal structure of the catalytic domain of yope-yersinia pestis gap effector protein.

Identifiers
- Symbol: YopE
- Pfam: PF03545
- InterPro: IPR014773
- SCOP2: 1g4w / SCOPe / SUPFAM
Available protein structures:
- PDB: IPR014773 PF03545 (ECOD; PDBsum)
- AlphaFold: IPR014773; PF03545

In molecular biology, the protein domain YopE refers to the secretion of virulence factors in Gram-negative bacteria involves transportation of the protein across two membranes to reach the cell exterior. It not only infects the host cell but also protects the bacteria. It undergoes several mechanisms to evade the host's immune system. This particular protein domain can be referred to as a Rho GTPase-activating protein (GAP).

== Function ==
YopE is an effector protein of the bacteria Yersinia. It functions as a Rho GTPase-activating protein (GAP). YopE acts as both a virulence factor and a protective antigen. In order to evade detection by the host, YopE uses a number of different eukaryotic signalling pathways to counteract innate and adaptive immune responses of the host. YopE targets the small GTPases: RhoA, Rac1, and Rac2. YopE GAP activity inhibits two common methods of host immunity - phagocytosis and reactive oxygen species generation. Additionally, it is thought that YopE targets the following immune cells, in particular:

- B lymphocytes,
- macrophages,
- dendritic cells,
- and neutrophils.

Evidence also suggests that CD8 T lymphocyte cells mediate protection against Yersinia by production of cytokines (e.g., tumor necrosis factor alpha [TNF-alpha] and gamma interferon [IFN]) and by killing bacteria-associated host cells to promote internalization by neighbouring phagocytes.

== Structure ==
Structurally speaking, YopE has 4 alpha helices arranged in a left handed Four-helical up-and-down bundle. This bundle acts as the GAP domain, because arginine from an alpha helix is inserted into a GTP-ase which catalyses GTP hydrolysis through stabilisation of the transition state.
