= Developmental Studies Hybridoma Bank =

Developmental Studies Hybridoma Bank (DSHB)
- Founded: 1986
- Type: Self-funded organization
- Location: Iowa City, Iowa, USA
- Services: Bank and distribute hybridomas and cell products
- Key people: David R. Soll

The Developmental Studies Hybridoma Bank (DSHB) is a National Resource established by the National Institutes of Health (NIH) in 1986 to bank and distribute at cost hybridomas and the monoclonal antibodies (mAbs) they produce to the basic science community worldwide. It is housed in the Department of Biology at the University of Iowa.

== Description ==
The DSHB is directed by David R. Soll at the University of Iowa. There are currently over 5000 hybridomas in the DSHB collection. The DSHB has obtained hybridomas from a variety of individuals and institutions, the latter including the Muscular Dystrophy Association, the National Cancer Institute, the NIH Common Fund, and the European Molecular Biology Laboratory (EMBL). The DSHB eagerly awaits new contributions. First time customers must agree to the DSHB terms of usage that products will be used for research purposes only, and that they cannot be commercialized or distributed to a third party. Researchers also agree to acknowledge both the DSHB and the contributing investigator and institution in publications that benefit from the use of DSHB products and provide to the DSHB citations of all publications. Individuals or institutions can deposit hybridomas for distribution at no cost. Contributing to the DSHB does not preclude the depositor from licensing cell lines for commercial purposes. The DSHB does not own any contributed intellectual property. The intellectual property remains that of the scientist and/or institution that banks the hybridomas. The DSHB covers the operating costs of maintaining, improving, producing and distributing products in the collection.

== History ==
The DSHB was created in 1986 by the NIH to bank and distribute hybridomas and the monoclonal antibodies (mAbs) they produce to the general scientific community in order to facilitate research. The DSHB was moved from Johns Hopkins University to the University of Iowa in 1996, and placed under the directorship of David R. Soll. The DSHB has been self-funded since 1997 and relies on no outside funding.

== Popular collections ==
- Cardiac Muscle
- CD Markers
- Cell Adhesion
- Cell Biomarkers
- Cytoskeleton
- Disease Biomarkers
- EMBL Protein Binders (Affinomics)
- Enzymes
- Epitope Tags
- Extracellular Matrix
- Microbes (Bacteria, Fungi, Viruses)
- Neurodevelopment
- Muscular Dystrophy Association mAbs
- NIH Common Fund Protein Capture Reagents
- NIH NCI CPTAC Cancer Targets
- Receptors
- Organelle-specific Biomarkers
- RNA/DNA Regulation
- Secreted Proteins
- Epitope Tags
- Skeletal Muscle
- Transcription Factors

== Noteworthy depositors ==
Nobel Prize and Alfred P. Sloan, Jr. Prize winner J. Michael Bishop deposited the anti c-MYC hybridoma 9e 10

Nobel Prize winner Sir John Gurdon deposited MyoD clone D7F2

Nobel Prize winner Eric F. Wieschaus deposited 7 hybridomas

National Academy of Sciences Members who have deposited hybridomas

- Utpal Banerjee (1 hybridoma deposit) University of California, Los Angeles
- Philip A. Beachy (5 hybridoma deposits) Stanford University
- Seymour Benzer (7 hybridoma deposits) California Institute of Technology
- J. Michael Bishop (1 hybridoma deposits) University of California, San Francisco
- Helen Blau (11 hybridoma deposits) Stanford University
- Kevin P. Campbell (9 hybridoma deposits) The University of Iowa
- Constance L. Cepko (1 hybridoma deposit) Harvard University
- Max Cooper (1 hybridoma deposit) Emory University
- Marilyn Gist Farquhar (1 hybridoma deposit) University of California, San Diego
- John Gurdon (1 hybridoma deposit) University of Cambridge
- Corey S. Goodman (25 hybridoma deposits) University of California, Berkeley
- Thomas M. Jessell (36 hybridoma deposits) Columbia University
- Robb Krumlauf (1 hybridoma deposit) Stowers Institute for Medical Research
- N. M. Le Douarin (6 hybridoma deposits) CNRS Institute of Embryology
- Gerald M. Rubin (20 hybridoma deposits) HHMI / Janelia Research Campus
- Joshua R. Sanes (11 hybridoma deposits) Harvard University
- S. J. Singer (1 hybridoma deposit) University of California, San Diego
- Roeland Nusse (2 hybridoma deposits) Stanford University
- Gertrud Schupbach (10 hybridoma deposits) Princeton University
- Timothy A. Springer (7 hybridoma deposits) Harvard University
- Masatoshi Takeichi (7 hybridoma deposits) RIKEN
- Stephen T. Warren (1 hybridoma deposit) Emory University
- Zena Werb (1 hybridoma deposit) University of California, San Francisco
- Eric F. Wieschaus (7 hybridoma deposits) Princeton University
