= SCPEP1 =

Enzyme

Identifiers
- Aliases: SCPEP1, HSCP1, RISC, serine carboxypeptidase 1
- External IDs: MGI: 1921867; GeneCards: SCPEP1

Gene location (Human)
Chr.	Chromosome 17 (human)
Band	17q22	Start	56,978,129 bp
Band	17q22	End	57,006,768 bp

Gene location (Mouse)
Chr.	Chromosome 11 (mouse)
Band	11|11 C	Start	88,814,846 bp
Band	11|11 C	End	88,846,291 bp
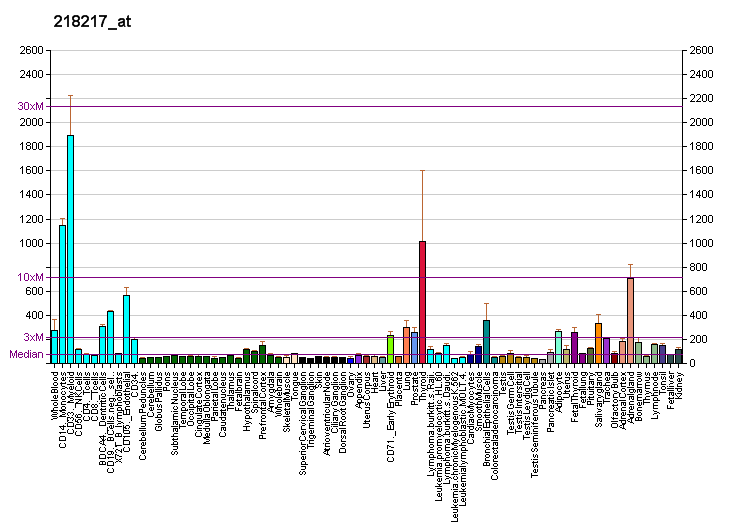
RNA expression pattern
Bgee	Human / Mouse (ortholog); Top expressed in: right adrenal cortex; monocyte; left adrenal cortex; olfactory zone of nasal mucosa; left lobe of thyroid gland; right lobe of thyroid gland; Descending thoracic aorta; gallbladder; ascending aorta; right coronary artery / Top expressed in: decidua; Gonadal ridge; gastrula; calvaria; pineal gland; external carotid artery; efferent ductule; internal carotid artery; iris; skin of abdomen; More reference expression data
BioGPS	More reference expression data
Gene ontology
Molecular function	carboxypeptidase activity; peptidase activity; hydrolase activity; serine-type carboxypeptidase activity
Cellular component	extracellular region; cytosol; extracellular exosome
Biological process	proteolysis involved in cellular protein catabolic process; retinoic acid metabolic process; negative regulation of blood pressure; proteolysis
Sources:Amigo / QuickGO
Orthologs
Databases	NCBI: entry; OMA: entry
Species	Human	Mouse
Entrez	59342	74617
Ensembl	ENSG00000121064	ENSMUSG00000000278
UniProt	Q9HB40	Q920A5
RefSeq (mRNA)	NM_021626	NM_029023
RefSeq (protein)	NP_067639	NP_083299
Location (UCSC)	Chr 17: 56.98 – 57.01 Mb	Chr 11: 88.81 – 88.85 Mb
PubMed search
- Wikidata
View/Edit Human	View/Edit Mouse

Retinoid-inducible serine carboxypeptidase is an enzyme that in humans is encoded by the SCPEP1 gene.

== See also ==
- Carboxypeptidase
  - Serine carboxypeptidase
- Retinoid
