= Jacob Soll =

American historian

- Born: 1968 (age 57–58); Madison, Wisconsin, U.S.
- Education: University of Iowa, École des Hautes Études en Sciences Sociales, Magdalene College, Cambridge
- Awards: 2005 Jacques Barzun Prize in Cultural History 2009 Guggenheim Fellowship 2011 MacArthur Fellowship 2011 National Endowment for the Humanities 2017 National Endowment for the Humanities Fellowship
- Scientific career
- Fields: Intellectual, political, and economic history and philosophy
- Workplaces: University of Southern California, Rutgers University-Camden, Princeton University
- Doctoral advisor: Peter Burke

Jacob Soll (born 1968) is an American university professor and professor of philosophy, history and accounting at the University of Southern California. Soll's work examines the mechanics of politics, statecraft and economics by dissecting the various elements of how modern states and political systems succeed and fail. He studies the philosophies of political and economic freedom with a focus on the relationship of the individual to the state.

His first book, Publishing The Prince: Reading, History, and the Birth of Political Criticism (2005), a study of the influence of Machiavelli's theory of prudence from the Enlightenment to the Renaissance, won the 2005 Jacques Barzun Prize in Cultural History.

Soll was awarded a Guggenheim Fellowship in 2009 to write his second book, The Information Master: Jean Baptiste Colbert's State Information System, a history of Louis XIV's famous finance minister, Jean-Baptiste Colbert's use of information in state-building.

In 2011, he was awarded a $500,000 MacArthur Fellowship, known as the "Genius Grant" for his work on the history of the state.

At the University of Southern California, he teaches on the philosophy of economic and political thought and Renaissance and Enlightenment history and has organized forums on European politics.

== Early life and education ==
Soll was born in Madison, Wisconsin. His parents are David Soll, a molecular geneticist, and Beth Soll, née Bronfenbrenner, a modern dance choreographer. His grandfather is child psychologist Urie Bronfenbrenner. Through his maternal grandmother, Liese Bronfenbrenner, née Price, Soll is the great-great-grandson of the German Orientalist, Eugen Prym (1843–1913), and great-grandson of the English author and professor, Hereward Thimbleby Price (1880–1964). Early hometowns included Cambridge, Massachusetts, Iowa City, and Paris, France.

He earned a B.A. from the University of Iowa in 1991, a D.E.A. in 1993 from École des Hautes Études en Sciences Sociales, and a Ph.D. in 1998 from Magdalene College, Cambridge.

== Career ==
Soll's first position was as a lecturer at Princeton University, where he worked for two years, from 1997 to 1999, and then as a professor of history at Rutgers University-Camden from 1999 to 2012. He was the Luso-American Foundation Fellow of Portugal's Biblioteca Nacionale de Lisboa; a Fernand Braudel Professor at the European University Institute in Florence in 2007; a visiting fellow at Trinity College, Cambridge in 2009; and a visiting fellow at the Max Planck Institute in 2018. In 2013, Soll delivered the Huygens-Descartes Lecture at the Akadamie van Wetenschappen in Amsterdam. Soll was named a university professor by USC president C. L. Max Nikias in 2018.

Soll's first book, Publishing The Prince (2005), examines the role of commentaries, editions, and translations of Niccolò Machiavelli produced by the previously little-studied figure Amelot de La Houssaye (1634–1706), who became the most influential writer on secular politics during the reign of Louis XIV. Grounded in analysis of archival, manuscript, and early printed sources, Soll shows how Abraham Nicolas Amelot de la Houssaye and his publishers arranged prefaces, columns, and footnotes in a manner that transformed established works, imbuing books previously considered as supporting royal power with an alternate, even revolutionary, political message. Publishing "The Prince" was the winner of the American Philosophical Society's 2005 Barzun Prize.

In his second book, The Information Master (2009), he investigates the formation of a state-information gathering and classifying network by Louis XIV's chief minister, Jean-Baptiste Colbert, revealing that Colbert's passion for information was both a means of control and a medium for his own political advancement: his systematic and encyclopedic information collection served to strengthen and uphold Louis XIV's absolute rule. With these and other projects in progress including an intellectual and practical history of accounting and its role in governance in the modern world and a study of the composition of library catalogues during the Enlightenment.

In 2014, he authored The Reckoning: Financial Accountability and the Rise and Fall of Nations (2014). A history of the role of accounting in political and financial accountability from the Ancient world to the modern age was a worldwide best-seller, particularly in Asia, where it received numerous positive reviews. The Financial Times wrote that:

Soll's wry and lucid book ... accountability and accountancy become a way of investigating the rise and fall of nations.

It also led to Soll taking an active role in advising the Greek government during its debt crisis. He addressed the Hellenic Parliament about the history of public financial management in June 2018, on the eve of the end of the Greek bailout. Soll has worked closely with Spanish Prime Minister Pedro Sánchez, and has advised the Portuguese government and European Commission.

In 2022, he authored Free Market: The History of an Idea (2022), an intellectual history of the free market, from ancient Rome to the twenty-first century.

== Journalistic contributions ==
Soll is a regular contributor to The New Republic, The New York Times, the Boston Globe, and The Chronicle of Higher Education. His 2015 New York Times article "Germany's Destructive Anger", about German attitudes towards the Greek debt was the subject of an article by Paul Krugman.

== Works ==
- Publishing The Prince: History, Reading, and the Birth of Political Criticism. University of Michigan Press. 2005. ISBN 978-0-472-11473-3.
- The Information Master: Jean-Baptiste Colbert's Secret State Intelligence System. University of Michigan Press. 2009. ISBN 978-0-472-11690-4.
- The Reckoning: Financial Accountability and the Making and Breaking of Nations. Basic Books Limited. 2014. ISBN 978-0-465-03663-9.
- Free Market: The History of an Idea. Basic Books. 2022. ISBN 978-0-465-04970-7.
- Ball, I.; Buiter, W.; Crompton, J.; Detter, D.; Soll, J. (2024). Public Net Worth: Accounting – Government – Democracy. London: Palgrave MacMillan. doi:10.1007/978-3-031-44343-5. ISBN 978-3-031-44342-8.
