= Phenotypic switching =

Aspect of cell biology

Phenotypic switching is switching between multiple cellular morphologies. David R. Soll described two such systems: the first high frequency switching system between several morphological stages and a second high frequency switching system between opaque and white cells. The latter is an epigenetic switching system

Phenotypic switching in Candida albicans is often used to refer to the epigenetic white-to-opaque switching system. C. albicans needs this switch for sexual mating. Next to the two above mentioned switching systems many other switching systems are known in C. albicans.

A second example occurs in melanoma, where malignantly transformed pigment cells switch back-and-forth between phenotypes of proliferation and invasion in response to changing microenvironments, driving metastatic progression.

== See also ==
- Polyphenism
