= Virulence factor =

Type of molecules produced by a pathogen that might cause potential harmful effects

Virulence factors (preferably known as pathogenicity factors or effectors in botany) are cellular structures, molecules and regulatory systems that enable microbial pathogens (bacteria, viruses, fungi, and protozoa) to achieve the following:

- colonization of a niche in the host (this includes movement towards and attachment to host cells)
- immunoevasion, evasion of the host's immune response
- immunosuppression, inhibition of the host's immune response (this includes leukocidin-mediated cell death)
- entry into and exit out of cells (if the pathogen is an intracellular one)
- obtain nutrition from the host

Specific pathogens possess a wide array of virulence factors. Some are chromosomally encoded and intrinsic to the bacteria (e.g. capsules and endotoxin), whereas others are obtained from mobile genetic elements like plasmids and bacteriophages (e.g. some exotoxins). Virulence factors encoded on mobile genetic elements spread through horizontal gene transfer, and can convert harmless bacteria into dangerous pathogens. Bacteria like Escherichia coli O157:H7 gain the majority of their virulence from mobile genetic elements. Gram-negative bacteria secrete a variety of virulence factors at host–pathogen interface, via membrane vesicle trafficking as bacterial outer membrane vesicles for invasion, nutrition and other cell-cell communications. It has been found that many pathogens have converged on similar virulence factors to battle against eukaryotic host defenses. These obtained bacterial virulence factors have two different routes used to help them survive and grow:

- The factors are used to assist and promote colonization of the host. These factors include adhesins, invasins, and antiphagocytic factors. Bacterial flagella that give motility are included in these virulence factors.
- The factors, including toxins, hemolysins and proteases, bring damage to the host.

== Attachment, immunoevasion, and immunosuppression ==
Bacteria produce various adhesins including lipoteichoic acid, trimeric autotransporter adhesins and a wide variety of other surface proteins to attach to host tissue.

Capsules, made of carbohydrate, form part of the outer structure of many bacterial cells including Neisseria meningitidis. Capsules play important roles in immune evasion, as they inhibit phagocytosis, as well as protecting the bacteria while outside the host.

Another group of virulence factors possessed by bacteria are immunoglobulin (Ig) proteases. Immunoglobulins are antibodies expressed and secreted by hosts in response to an infection. These immunoglobulins play a major role in destruction of the pathogen through mechanisms such as opsonization. Some bacteria, such as Streptococcus pyogenes, are able to break down the host's immunoglobulins using proteases.

Viruses also have notable virulence factors. Experimental research, for example, often focuses on creating environments that isolate and identify the role of "niche-specific virulence genes". These are genes that perform specific tasks within specific tissues/places at specific times; the sum total of niche-specific genes is the virus' virulence. Genes characteristic of this concept are those that control latency in some viruses like herpes. Murine gamma herpesvirus 68 (γHV68) and human herpesviruses depend on a subset of genes that allow them to maintain a chronic infection by reactivating when specific environmental conditions are met. Even though they are not essential for lytic phases of the virus, these latency genes are important for promoting chronic infection and continued replication within infected individuals.

== Destructive enzymes ==
Some bacteria, such as Streptococcus pyogenes, Staphylococcus aureus and Pseudomonas aeruginosa, produce a variety of enzymes which cause damage to host tissues. Enzymes include hyaluronidase, which breaks down the connective tissue component hyaluronic acid; a range of proteases and lipases; DNases, which break down DNA; and hemolysins, which break down a variety of host cells, including red blood cells.

== GTPases ==
A major group of virulence factors are proteins that can control the activation levels of GTPases. There are two ways in which they act. One is by acting as a guanine nucleotide exchange factor (GEF) or GTPase-activating protein (GAP), and proceeding to look like a normally eukaryotic cellular protein. The other is covalently modifying the GTPase itself. The first way is reversible; many bacteria like Salmonella have two proteins to turn the GTPases on and off. The other process is irreversible, using toxins to completely change the target GTPase and shut down or override gene expression.

One example of a bacterial virulence factor acting like a eukaryotic protein is Salmonella protein SopE it acts as a GEF, turning the GTPase on to create more GTP. It does not modify anything, but overdrives normal cellular internalization process, making it easier for the Bacteria to be colonized within a host cell.

YopT (Yersinia outer protein T) from Yersinia is an example of modification of the host. It modifies the proteolytic cleavage of carboxyl terminus of RhoA, releasing RhoA from the membrane. The mislocalization of RhoA causes downstream effectors to not work.

== Toxins ==
A major category of virulence factors are bacterial toxins. These are divided into two groups: endotoxins and exotoxins.

=== Endotoxins ===
Endotoxin is a component (lipopolysaccharide (LPS)) of the cell wall of gram-negative bacteria. It is the lipid A part of this LPS which is toxic. Lipid A is an endotoxin. Endotoxins trigger intense inflammation. They bind to receptors on monocytes causing the release of inflammatory mediators which induce degranulation. As part of this immune response cytokines are released; these can cause the fever and other symptoms seen during disease. If a high amount of LPS is present then septic shock (or endotoxic shock) may result which, in severe cases, can lead to death. As glycolipids (as opposed to peptides), endotoxins are not bound by B or T-cell receptors and do not elicit an adaptive immune response.

=== Exotoxins ===
Some bacteria secrete exotoxins, which have a wide range of effects, including inhibiting certain biochemical pathways in the host. The two most potent known exotoxins are the tetanus toxin (tetanospasmin) secreted by Clostridium tetani and the botulinum toxin secreted by Clostridium botulinum. Exotoxins are also produced by a range of other bacteria including Escherichia coli; Vibrio cholerae (causative agent of cholera); Clostridium perfringens (common causative agent of food poisoning as well as gas gangrene) and Clostridioides difficile (causative agent of pseudomembranous colitis). A potent three-protein virulence factor produced by Bacillus anthracis, called anthrax toxin, plays a key role in anthrax pathogenesis. Exotoxins are extremely immunogenic and trigger the humoral response (antibodies target the toxin).

Exotoxins are also produced by some fungi as a competitive resource. The toxins, named mycotoxins, deter other organisms from consuming the food the fungi colonise. As with bacterial toxins, there is a wide array of fungal toxins. Arguably one of the more dangerous mycotoxins is aflatoxin produced by certain species of the genus Aspergillus (notably A. flavus). If ingested repeatedly, this toxin can cause serious liver damage.

== Examples ==
Examples of virulence factors for Staphylococcus aureus are hyaluronidase, protease, coagulase, lipases, deoxyribonucleases and enterotoxins. Examples for Streptococcus pyogenes are M protein, lipoteichoic acid, hyaluronic acid capsule, destructive enzymes (including streptokinase, streptodornase, and hyaluronidase), and exotoxins (including streptolysin). Examples for Listeria monocytogenes include internalin A, internalin B, listeriolysin O, and actA, all of which are used to help colonize the host. Examples for Yersinia pestis are an altered form of lipopolysaccharide, type three secretion system, and YopE and YopJ pathogenicity. The cytolytic peptide Candidalysin is produced during hyphal formation by Candida albicans; it is an example of a virulence factor from a fungus. Other virulence factors include factors required for biofilm formation (e.g. sortases) and integrins (e.g. beta-1 and 3).

In enteric pathogens such as Salmonella and E. coli, the membrane protein IgaA regulates the Rcs phosphorelay system, which modulates virulence factors including capsule synthesis, biofilm formation, and motility.

== Inhibition and control ==
Strategies to target virulence factors and the genes encoding them have been proposed. Small molecules being investigated for their ability to inhibit virulence factors and virulence factor expression include alkaloids, flavonoids, and peptides. Experimental studies are done to characterize specific bacterial pathogens and to identify their specific virulence factors. Scientists are trying to better understand these virulence factors through identification and analysis to better understand the infectious process in hopes that new diagnostic techniques, specific antimicrobial compounds, and effective vaccines or toxoids may be eventually produced to treat and prevent infection. There are three general experimental ways for the virulence factors to be identified: biochemically, immunologically, and genetically. For the most part, the genetic approach is the most extensive way in identifying the bacterial virulence factors. Bacterial DNA can be altered from pathogenic to non-pathogenic, random mutations may be introduced to their genome, specific genes encoding for membrane or secretory products may be identified and mutated, and genes that regulate virulence genes maybe identified.

Experiments involving Yersinia pseudotuberculosis have been used to change the virulence phenotype of non-pathogenic bacteria to pathogenic. Because of horizontal gene transfer, it is possible to transfer the a clone of the DNA from Yersinia to a non-pathogenic E. coli and have them express the pathogenic virulence factor. Transposon, a DNA element inserted at random, mutagenesis of bacteria DNA is also a highly used experimental technique done by scientists. These transposons carry a marker that can be identified within the DNA. When placed at random, the transposon may be placed next to a virulence factor or placed in the middle of a virulence factor gene, which stops the expression of the virulence factor. By doing so, scientists can make a library of the genes using these markers and easily find the genes that cause the virulence factor.

== See also ==
- Resistance-Nodulation-Cell Division Superfamily (RND)
- Filamentation
