= David R. Soll =

American microbiologist

- Born: April 2, 1942 (age 84); Philadelphia, Pennsylvania, USA
- Education: University of Wisconsin–Madison
- Occupation: Biologist
- Known for: Motion analysis of living cells monoclonal antibody technologies Candida albicans
- Awards: Roy J. and Lucille Carver/Emil Witschi Professorship of the Biological Sciences (1989); Lucille K. George Medal (2009); Rhoda Benham Award (2013); Ian Murray Memorial Award from the British Society of Medical Mycology (1988, 2003)
- Scientific career
- Workplaces: The University of Iowa; Developmental Studies Hybridoma Bank; WM Keck Dynamic Image Analysis Facility

David R. Soll (born April 29, 1942) is a professor of Biology at the University of Iowa. He is best known for the motion analysis of living cells, the discovery of Candida albicans phenotypic switching and monoclonal antibody technology.

Soll directed the Developmental Studies Hybridoma Bank from 1995 to 2021, and the WM Keck Dynamic Image Analysis Facility from 1985 to 2021.

A fellow of both the American Academy of Microbiology and the American Association for the Advancement of Science since 2006, he has published more than four hundred articles in various fields of biomedicine. A recipient of more than seventy-eight grants and contracts, he has also founded four companies, and is active on several editorial boards for major scientific publications.

== Background ==
Soll was born in South Philadelphia, Pennsylvania, and graduated from Central High School for Boys in 1959 with a bachelor of arts degree. He was inducted into the Central High School Hall of Fame in 2018.

A student at the University of Wisconsin from 1960 to 1969, he earned his bachelor of science, master of science and doctor of philosophy degrees there. He then served as a post-doctoral fellow at Brandeis University, where he taught Introductory Biology.

In 1972, he joined the Department of Biology at the University of Iowa as an assistant professor, was promoted to associate professor in 1976 and to full professor in 1982. In 1989, he was awarded the Roy J. and Lucille Carver/Emil Witschi Professorship of the Biological Sciences; he also became a full professor of Dentistry that same year.

In 2005 and 2006, respectively, he was elected as a fellow of the American Association for the Advancement of Science (AAAS) and the American Academy of Microbiology. In 2009, he was awarded the Lucille K. George Medal from the International Society for Human and Animal Mycology, and in 2013, he was awarded the Rhoda Benham Medal from the Medical Mycological Society of the Americas.

== Family ==
Soll was married for thirty years to Michele Morice (1980-2010), and is currently married to Dr. Melinda A. Weinstein. He has three children, Jacob Soll, Samantha Soll and Benjamin Soll.

== Career ==
From 1965 to 1970, Soll worked on the germination of Blastoclandiella emersonii under the mentorship of David Sonneborn and discovered that complex differentiations can be preprogrammed and occur without RNA or protein synthesis.

From 1972 to 1978, he and his colleagues worked on the "accumulation and erasure of morphogenetics information" in Dictyostelium discoideum. In 1979, he formulated the first model and conditional methods to analyze timer pathways in developing systems. From 1977 to 1984, he developed pH-regulated dimorphism and applied it to study the regulation of the bud-hypha transition in Candida albicans.

Between 1985 and 1987, Soll and his colleagues discovered the first high frequency switching system in the pathogenic yeast Candida albicans. In addition to this phenotypic, morphological switching system, he and his co-workers also discovered the epigenetic, phenotypic white-to-opaque switching system.

In 1989, Soll and Dr. E. Voss finished and licensed the Dynamic Motion Analyses System (DMS), to Motion Analyses Corporation of Santa Rosa, CA. In 1997, Soll and Voss obtained the patent for DIAS, the next generation of DMS. In 1992, Soll founded the company Solltech, Inc., a computer software and hardware development company to develop and distribute DIAS.

From 1987 to 1995, Soll and his co-workers developed the first DNA fingerprinting probes for studying the population structure of infectious fungi, and in 1995 received a patent for the software DENDRON, which analyzed DNA fingerprints.

In 1995, Soll formed the company Caviforce Technologies to develop a method of using ultrasound for seed germination. From 1995 to 2004, he and his colleagues developed the first 3D Dynamic Image Analysis System (3D-DIAS) for cells and embryos, describing how embryos form and amoeboid cells crawl.

Ultrasound Solutions Inc., was then formed in 1999 to develop the technology to use ultrasound in waste management.

In 2003, Soll founded the company Solltechnologies Inc., to sell DIAS and Dendron software. Since 2005, he and his colleagues discovered that Candida albicans forms a "pathogenic" biofilm and a "sexual" biofilm, depending on the configuration of the mating type locus and identified the alternative pathways regulating each biofilm.

From 2011 to present, Soll and his colleagues also developed a 4D model for reconstructing and motion analyzing cancer cells and tumorigenesis.

== Current Work ==
Soll continues to publish on 1) the role of mating and switching in the pathogenesis of Candida albicans, 2) cell motility and the cytoskeleton, 3) advanced monoclonal antibody technology and 4) methods for suppressing tumorigenesis in cancer patients using monoclonal antibodies. In 2019, he began adapting the software programs DIAS and DENDRON to study digitized fine art paintings.
