= Carboxypeptidase D =

Class of enzymes

Identifiers
- EC no.: 3.4.16.6
- CAS no.: 153967-26-1

Databases
- BRENDA: enzyme data
- ExPASy: NiceZyme view
- KEGG: enzyme entry
- MetaCyc: metabolic pathway
- Rhea: reactions
- PDB structures: RCSB PDB PDBe PDBsum
Search
- PMC: articles
- PubMed: articles
- NCBI: proteins

Carboxypeptidase D can refer to one of several enzymes. A family of serine carboxypeptidases (i.e. enzymes that use an active site serine residue) includes (EC 3.4.16.6, cereal serine carboxypeptidase II, Saccharomyces cerevisiae KEX1 gene product, carboxypeptidase Kex1, gene KEX1 serine carboxypeptidase, KEX1 carboxypeptidase, KEX1 proteinase, KEX1DELTAp, CPDW-II, serine carboxypeptidase, Phaseolus proteinase) is an enzyme. This enzyme has an optimal pH of 4.5-6.0, is inhibited by diisopropyl fluorophosphate, and catalyses the following chemical reaction

Preferential release of a C-terminal arginine or lysine residue

A completely distinct enzyme has also been named carboxypeptidase D (EC number 3.4.17.22). This second enzyme is a metallocarboxypeptidase (i.e. uses a zinc ion in the active site instead of a serine residue) and is broadly expressed in mammalian tissues. Like the serine carboxypeptidase, the metallocarboxypeptidase D also removes C-terminal arginine or lysine residues from peptides, with an optimal pH range of 5 to 7. Metallocarboxypeptidase D is located in the trans Golgi network where it contributes to the biosynthesis of neuropeptides and peptide hormones (such as insulin) along with carboxypeptidase E. In addition to this role, metallocarboxypeptidase D contributes to the processing of proteins, following the action of furin (an endoprotease located in the trans Golgi network). The duck ortholog of metallocarboxypeptidase D was named gp180 and is a receptor for the uptake of duck hepatitis B virus. In fruit fly (Drosophila melanogaster), carboxypeptidase D is known as the silver mutation, with defects causing altered wing shape. Metallocarboxypeptidase D is generally a membrane-bound protein, although in some organisms a soluble form is generated by either differential RNA splicing or by proteolytic activity. In the scientific literature, most of the published articles using the name "Carboxypeptidase D" in the title refer to metallocarboxypeptidase D and not the serine carboxypeptidase.
