= Abraham Nicolas Amelot de la Houssaye =

French historian and political critic

Abraham Nicolas Amelot de la Houssaye (1634–1706) was a French historian and political critic.

== Life ==
He was born at Orléans in February 1634 and died at Paris on 8 December 1706. Little is known of his personal history beyond the fact that he was secretary to an embassy from the French court to the Republic of Venice.

== Works ==
In his Histoire du gouvernement de Venise, he undertook to explain, and above all to criticize, the administration of that republic, and to expose the causes of its decadence. The work was printed by the King's printer and dedicated to Louvois, which suggests that the government did not disapprove of it. It appeared in March 1676 and drew a heated protest from the Venetian ambassador, Marcantonio Giustinian, later the doge of Venice. The author was sent to the Bastille, where he remained for six weeks.

A second edition with a supplement, published immediately after, drew fresh protestations and was suppressed. This persecution gave the book such notoriety that it passed through twenty-two editions in three years and was translated into several languages; there is an English translation by Lord Falconbridge, son-in-law of Oliver Cromwell. Amelot next published in 1683 a translation of Paolo Sarpi's History of the Council of Trent. This work, and especially certain notes added by the translator, so offended advocates of the unlimited authority of the Pope that three memorials were presented asking for its repression. Under the pseudonym of La Motte Josseval, Amelot later published Discours politique sur Tacite, in which he analysed the character of Tiberius.

After the death of Amelot de La Houssaye, an edition of his Reflections, Sentences and Moral Maxims was published in Paris in 1714.

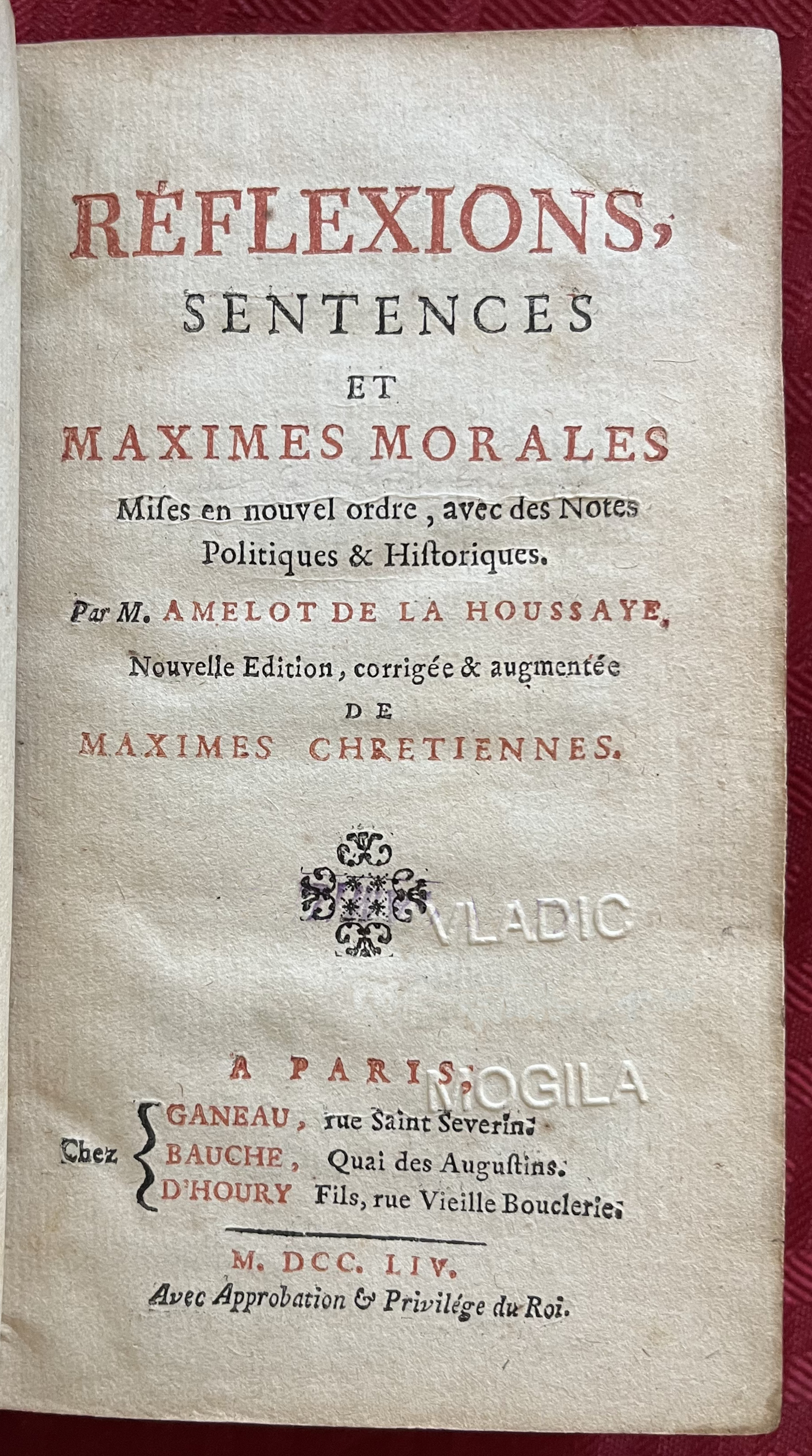
Réflexions, Sentences et Maximes Morales

A 21st-century interpretation of Amelot's role argues that Amelot, having been jailed for his political criticism expressed in his History of the Government of Venice, turned to annotated editions of classic and renaissance texts in order to continue his critique of the absolutist government of Louis XIV by indirect means. Amelot's versions of Tacitus' account of Tiberius and other sections of the Annales, along with his influential translation of Machiavelli's The Prince, became crucial elements in the development and expansion of critical political analysis under the ancien régime. To function under conditions of censorship, Amelot thinly veiled his political views as comments on other writers. In doing so, he exposed the absolutist claims of monarchy to examination by the literate bourgeoisie.
