= IMViC =

Microbiological and biochemical method for identification

The IMViC tests are a group of individual tests used in microbiology lab testing to identify an organism in the coliform group. A coliform is a gram negative, aerobic, or facultative anaerobic rod, which produces gas from lactose within 48 hours. The presence of some coliforms indicate fecal contamination.

The term "IMViC" is an acronym for each of these tests. "I" is for indole test; "M" is for methyl red test; "V" is for Voges-Proskauer test, and "C" is for citrate test. The lower case "i" is merely for "in" as the Citrate test requires coliform samples to be placed "in Citrate".

These tests are useful in distinguishing members of Enterobacteriaceae.

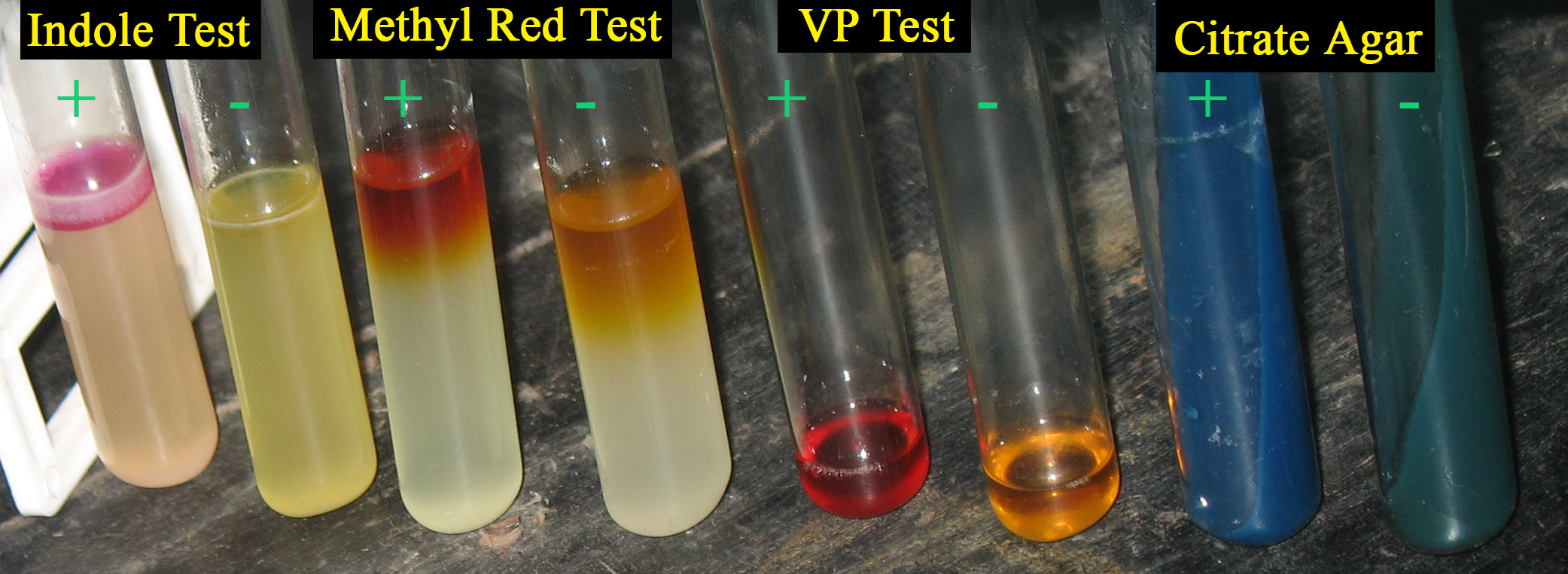
IMViC Results

== Indole test ==
In this test, the organism under consideration is grown in peptone water broth. It contains tryptophan, which under the action of enzyme tryptophanase is converted to an Indole molecule, pyruvate and ammonium. The indole is then extracted from the broth by means of xylene. The broth is sterilized for 15 minutes at around 121 °C. To test the broth for indole production, Kovac's reagent . Kovac's reagent consist of amyl alcohol and para-dimethylaminobenzaldehyde and concentrated hydrochloric acid. Kovac's reagent is actually used to determine ability of an organism to separate indole from amino acid tryptophan and it is added after incubation. A positive result is indicated by a pink/red layer forming on top of the liquid.

== Methyl red and Voges–Proskauer test ==
These tests both use the same broth for bacterial growth. The broth is called MR-VP broth. After growth, the broth is separated into two different tubes, one for the methyl red (MR) test and one for the Voges-Proskauer (VP) test.

The methyl red test detects production of acids formed during metabolism using mixed acid fermentation pathway using pyruvate as a substrate. The pH indicator Methyl Red is added to one tube and a red color appears at pH's lower than 4.2, indicating a positive test (mixed acid fermentation is used). The solution remaining yellow (pH = 6.2 or above) indicates a negative test, meaning the butanediol fermentation is used.

The VP test uses alpha-naphthol and potassium hydroxide to test for the presence of acetylmethylcarbinol (acetoin), an intermediate of the 2,3-butanediol fermentation pathway. After adding both reagents, the tube is shaken vigorously then allowed to sit for 5–10 minutes. A pinkish-red color indicates a positive test, meaning the 2,3-butanediol fermentation pathway is used.

== Citrate test ==
In the 1930's, S.A. Koser conducted experiments that were used to study bacterial catabolism of organic acids. Koser found that citrate metabolism could be an indicator for bacteria found in natural environments. Additionally, citrate could be used to distinguish bacterial coliforms found in soil, and aquatic environments, such as Enterobacteriaceae, and coliforms with fecal contamination. It was found that coilforms without fecal contamination grew, while the coilforms with fecal contamination did not grow.

This test uses Simmon's citrate agar to determine the ability of a microorganism to use citrate as its sole carbon and energy source. The agar contains citrate and ammonium ions (nitrogen source) and bromothymol blue (BTB) as a pH indicator. Bromothymol blue was added in order to reduce false positives. The citrate agar is green before inoculation, and turns blue, because of BTB as a positive test indicator, meaning citrate is utilized. The test is also prepared on a slant to maximize bacterial growth for an even better indication of the use of citrate.

== Usage ==
These IMViC tests are useful for differentiating the family Enterobacteriaceae, especially when used alongside the Urease test.

The IMViC results of some important species are shown below.

Species	Indole	Methyl Red	Voges-Proskauer	Citrate
Escherichia coli	Positive	Positive	Negative	Negative
Staphylococcus aureus	Negative	Positive	Positive	Negative
Shigella spp.	Negative	Positive	Negative	Negative
Salmonella spp.	Negative	Positive	Negative	Positive
Klebsiella spp.	Negative	Negative	Positive	Positive
Proteus vulgaris	Positive	Positive	Negative	Negative
Proteus mirabilis	Negative	Positive	Negative	Positive
Citrobacter freundii	Negative	Positive	Negative	Positive
Enterobacter aerogenes	Negative	Negative	Positive	Positive
