= 5-dehydro-2-deoxygluconokinase =

Class of enzymes

Identifiers
- EC no.: 2.7.1.92
- CAS no.: 62213-35-8

Databases
- IntEnz: IntEnz view
- BRENDA: BRENDA entry
- ExPASy: NiceZyme view
- KEGG: KEGG entry
- MetaCyc: metabolic pathway
- PRIAM: profile
- PDB structures: RCSB PDB PDBe PDBsum
- Gene Ontology: AmiGO / QuickGO
Search
- PMC: articles
- PubMed: articles
- NCBI: proteins

5-dehydro-2-deoxygluconokinase (EC 2.7.1.92) is an enzyme that catalyzes the following chemical reaction:

ATP +
2-deoxy-D-gluc-5-ulosonic acid
ADP +
6-phospho-5-dehydro-2-deoxy-D-gluconic acid

The enzyme characterised from Aerobacter aerogenes converts 2-deoxy-D-gluc-5-ulosonic acid to its monophosphate, 6-phospho-5-dehydro-2-deoxy-D-gluconic acid by transferring a phosphate group from the cofactor, adenosine triphosphate (ATP), which is converted to adenosine diphosphate (ADP). This is part of the breakdown of myo-inositol in this organism.

This enzyme is a transferase, specifically one transferring phosphorus-containing groups (phosphotransferases) with an alcohol group as acceptor. The systematic name of this enzyme class is ATP:5-dehydro-2-deoxy-D-gluconate 6-phosphotransferase. Other names in common use include 5-keto-2-deoxygluconokinase, 5-keto-2-deoxyglucono kinase (phosphorylating), and DKH kinase.
