= Dehydrogluconokinase =

Enzyme

Identifiers
- EC no.: 2.7.1.13
- CAS no.: 9030-56-2

Databases
- IntEnz: IntEnz view
- BRENDA: BRENDA entry
- ExPASy: NiceZyme view
- KEGG: KEGG entry
- MetaCyc: metabolic pathway
- PRIAM: profile
- PDB structures: RCSB PDB PDBe PDBsum
- Gene Ontology: AmiGO / QuickGO
Search
- PMC: articles
- PubMed: articles
- NCBI: proteins

Dehydrogluconokinase (EC 2.7.1.13) is an enzyme that catalyzes the chemical reaction

ATP +
2-dehydro-D-gluconic acid
ADP +
6-phospho-2-dehydro-D-gluconic acid

The enzyme characterised from Aerobacter aerogenes converts the hexose sugar, 2-dehydro-D-gluconic acid, to 6-phospho-2-dehydro-D-gluconic acid by transferring a phosphate group from the cofactor, adenosine triphosphate (ATP), which is converted to adenosine diphosphate (ADP).

This enzyme is a transferase, specifically one transferring phosphorus-containing groups (phosphotransferases) with an alcohol group as acceptor. The systematic name of this enzyme class is ATP:2-dehydro-D-gluconate 6-phosphotransferase. Other names in common use include ketogluconokinase, 2-ketogluconate kinase, ketogluconokinase (phosphorylating), and 2-ketogluconokinase.
