= S-methyl-5-thioribose kinase =

Identifiers
- EC no.: 2.7.1.100
- CAS no.: 68247-56-3

Databases
- IntEnz: IntEnz view
- BRENDA: BRENDA entry
- ExPASy: NiceZyme view
- KEGG: KEGG entry
- MetaCyc: metabolic pathway
- PRIAM: profile
- PDB structures: RCSB PDB PDBe PDBsum
- Gene Ontology: AmiGO / QuickGO
Search
- PMC: articles
- PubMed: articles
- NCBI: proteins

S-methyl-5-thioribose kinase (EC 2.7.1.100) is an enzyme that catalyzes the chemical reaction:

ATP +
S-methyl-5-thio-D-ribose
ADP +
S-methyl-5-thio-α-D-ribose 1-phosphate

The enzyme, which is found in Enterobacter aerogenes and plants, converts S-methyl-5-thio-D-ribose to its monophosphate, S-methyl-5-thio-α-D-ribose 1-phosphate by transferring a phosphate group from the cofactor, adenosine triphosphate (ATP), which is converted to adenosine diphosphate (ADP).

This enzyme belongs to the family of transferases, specifically those transferring phosphorus-containing groups (phosphotransferases) with an alcohol group as acceptor. The systematic name of this enzyme class is ATP:S-methylmethyl-5-thio-D-ribose 1-phosphotransferase. Other names in common use include 5-methylthioribose kinase (phosphorylating), methylthioribose kinase, 5-methylthioribose kinase, and ATP:S5-methyl-5-thio-D-ribose 1-phosphotransferase. This enzyme participates in methionine metabolism.

== Structural studies ==
As of late 2007, 6 structures have been solved for this class of enzymes, with PDB accession codes PDB: 2OLC, PDB: 2PU8, PDB: 2PUI, PDB: 2PUL, PDB: 2PUN, and PDB: 2PUP.
