= Beta-glucoside kinase =

Class of enzymes

Identifiers
- EC no.: 2.7.1.85
- CAS no.: 37205-53-1

Databases
- IntEnz: IntEnz view
- BRENDA: BRENDA entry
- ExPASy: NiceZyme view
- KEGG: KEGG entry
- MetaCyc: metabolic pathway
- PRIAM: profile
- PDB structures: RCSB PDB PDBe PDBsum
- Gene Ontology: AmiGO / QuickGO
Search
- PMC: articles
- PubMed: articles
- NCBI: proteins

Beta-glucoside kinase (EC 2.7.1.85) is an enzyme that catalyzes the chemical reaction

ATP +
cellobiose
ADP +
cellobiose monophosphate

The enzyme first characterised from Aerobacter aerogenes converts cellobiose to its monophosphate, 6-phospho-β-D-glucosyl-(1,4)-D-glucose by transferring a phosphate group from the cofactor, adenosine triphosphate (ATP), which is converted to adenosine diphosphate (ADP).

This enzyme is a transferase, specifically one transferring phosphorus-containing groups (phosphotransferases) with an alcohol group as acceptor. The systematic name of this enzyme class is ATP:cellobiose 6-phosphotransferase. This enzyme is also called beta-D-glucoside kinase (phosphorylating).
