= Capsular-polysaccharide endo-1,3-α-galactosidase =

Identifiers
- EC no.: 3.2.1.87
- CAS no.: 62213-16-5

Databases
- IntEnz: IntEnz view
- BRENDA: BRENDA entry
- ExPASy: NiceZyme view
- KEGG: KEGG entry
- MetaCyc: metabolic pathway
- PRIAM: profile
- PDB structures: RCSB PDB PDBe PDBsum
Search
- PMC: articles
- PubMed: articles
- NCBI: proteins

Capsular-polysaccharide endo-1,3-α-galactosidase (EC 3.2.1.87, polysaccharide depolymerase, capsular polysaccharide galactohydrolase) is an enzyme with systematic name Aerobacter-capsular-polysaccharide galactohydrolase. It catalyses random hydrolysis of (1→3)-α-D-galactosidic linkages in Aerobacter aerogenes capsular polysaccharide. It hydrolyses the galactosyl-α-1,3-D-galactose linkages only in the complex substrate, bringing about depolymerization.
