= Mixed acid fermentation =

Biochemical conversion of six-carbon sugars into acids in bacteria

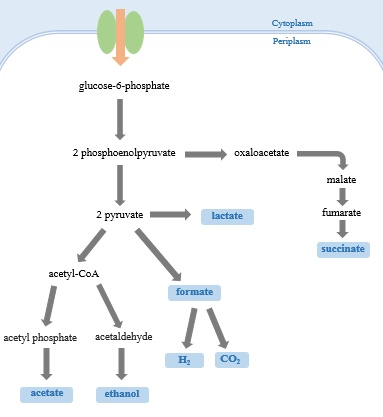
The mixed acid fermentation pathway in E. coli. End products are highlighted in blue.

In biochemistry, mixed acid fermentation is the metabolic process by which a six-carbon sugar (e.g. glucose, C_{6}H_{12}O_{6}) is converted into a complex and variable mixture of acids. It is a fermentation reaction that is common in bacteria. It is characteristic for members of the Enterobacteriaceae, a large family of Gram-negative bacteria that includes E. coli.

The mixture of end products produced by mixed acid fermentation includes lactate, acetate, succinate, formate, ethanol and the gases H_{2} and CO_{2}. The formation of these end products depends on the presence of certain key enzymes in the bacterium. The proportion in which they are formed varies between different bacterial species. The mixed acid fermentation pathway differs from other fermentation pathways, which produce fewer end products in fixed amounts. The end products of mixed acid fermentation can have many useful applications in biotechnology and industry. For instance, ethanol is widely used as a biofuel. Therefore, multiple bacterial strains have been metabolically engineered in the laboratory to increase the individual yields of certain end products. This research has been carried out primarily in E. coli and is ongoing. Variations of mixed acid fermentation occur in a number of bacterial species, including bacterial pathogens such as Haemophilus influenzae where mostly acetate and succinate are produced and lactate can serve as a growth substrate.

== Mixed acid fermentation in E. coli ==
E. coli use fermentation pathways as a final option for energy metabolism, as they produce very little energy in comparison to respiration. Mixed acid fermentation in E. coli occurs in two stages. These stages are outlined by the biological database for E. coli, EcoCyc.

The first of these two stages is a glycolysis reaction. Under anaerobic conditions, a glycolysis reaction takes place where glucose is converted into pyruvate:

glucose → 2 pyruvate

There is a net production of 2 ATP and 2 NADH molecules per molecule of glucose converted. ATP is generated by substrate-level phosphorylation. NADH is formed from the reduction of NAD.

In the second stage, pyruvate produced by glycolysis is converted to one or more end products via the following reactions. In each case, both of the NADH molecules generated by glycolysis are reoxidizeed to NAD^{+}. Each alternative pathway requires a different key enzyme in E. coli. After the variable amounts of different end products are formed by these pathways, they are secreted from the cell.

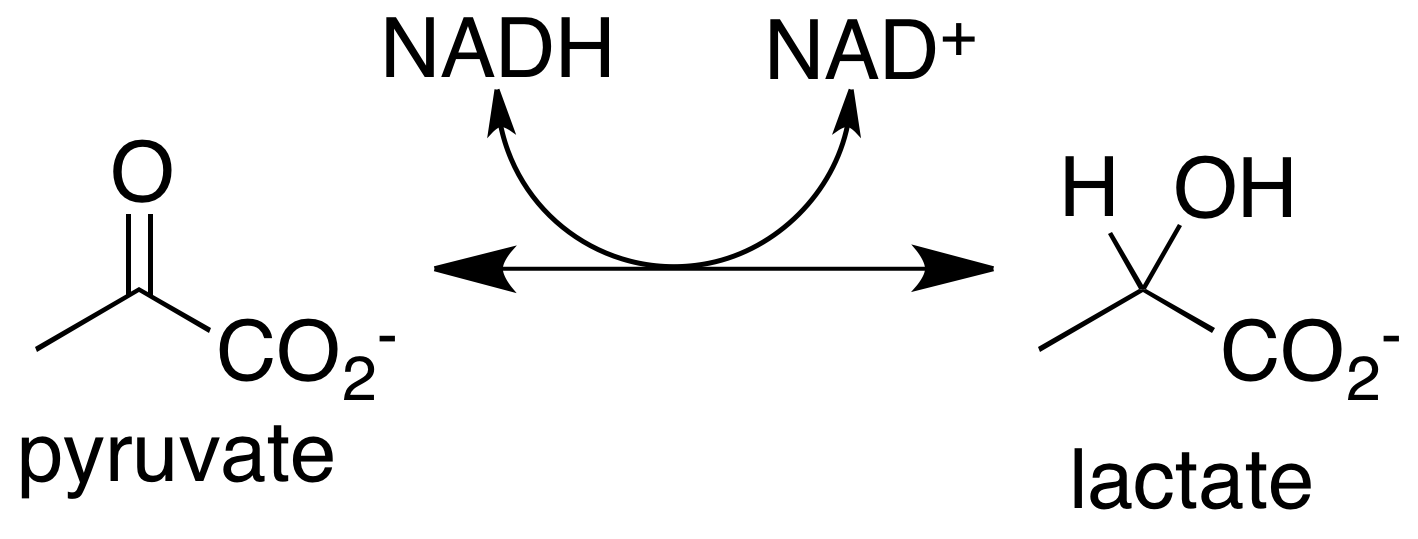
The conversion of pyruvate to lactate is catalysed by the enzyme lactate dehydrogenase.

=== Lactate formation ===
Pyruvate produced by glycolysis is converted to lactate. This reaction is catalysed by the enzyme lactate dehydrogenase (LDHA).

pyruvate + NADH + H^{+} → lactate + NAD^{+}

=== Acetate formation ===
Pyruvate is converted into acetyl-coenzyme A (acetyl-CoA) by the enzyme pyruvate dehydrogenase. This acetyl-CoA is then converted into acetate in E. coli, whilst producing ATP by substrate-level phosphorylation. Acetate formation requires two enzymes: phosphate acetyltransferase and acetate kinase.

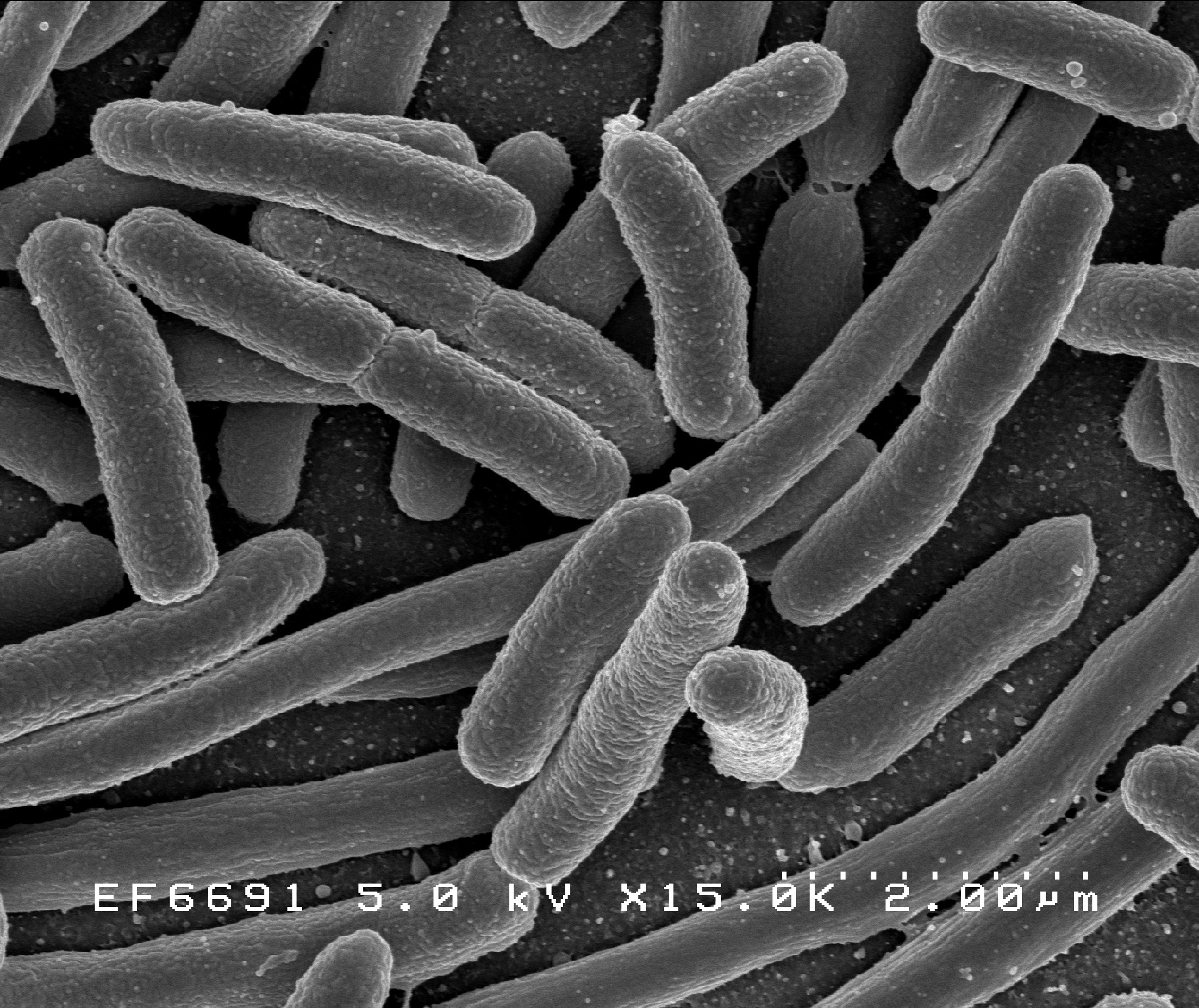
The mixed acid fermentation pathway is characteristic of the family Enterobacteriaceae, which includes E. coli

acetyl-CoA + phosphate → acetyl-phosphate + CoA

acetyl-phosphate + ADP → acetate + ATP

=== Ethanol formation ===
Ethanol is formed in E. coli by the reduction of acetyl coenzyme A using NADH. This two-step reaction requires the enzyme alcohol dehydrogenase (ADHE).

acetyl-CoA + NADH + H^{+} → acetaldehyde + NAD^{+} + CoA

acetaldehyde + NADH + H^{+} → ethanol + NAD^{+}

=== Formate formation ===
Formate is produced by the cleavage of pyruvate. This reaction is catalysed by the enzyme pyruvate-formate lyase (PFL), which plays an important role in regulating anaerobic fermentation in E. coli.

pyruvate + CoA → acetyl-CoA + formate

=== Succinate formation ===
Skeletal structure of succinate

Succinate is formed in E. coli in several steps.

Phosphoenolpyruvate (PEP), a glycolysis pathway intermediate, is carboxylated by the enzyme PEP carboxylase to form oxaloacetate. This is followed by the conversion of oxaloacetate to malate by the enzyme malate dehydrogenase. Fumarate hydratase then catalyses the dehydration of malate to produce fumarate.

phosphoenolpyruvate + HCO_{3} → oxaloacetate + phosphate

oxaloacetate + NADH + H^{+} → malate + NAD^{+}

malate → fumarate + H_{2}O

The final reaction in the formation of succinate is the reduction of fumarate. It is catalysed by the enzyme fumarate reductase.

fumarate + NADH + H^{+} → succinate + NAD^{+}

This reduction is an anaerobic respiration reaction in E. coli, as it uses electrons associated with NADH dehydrogenase and the electron transport chain. ATP is generated by using an electrochemical gradient and ATP synthase. This is the only case in the mixed acid fermentation pathway where ATP is not produced via substrate-level phosphorylation.

Vitamin K_{2}, also known as menaquinone, is very important for electron transport to fumarate in E. coli.

=== Hydrogen and carbon dioxide formation ===
Formate can be converted to hydrogen gas and carbon dioxide in E. coli. This reaction requires the enzyme formate-hydrogen lyase. It can be used to prevent the conditions inside the cell becoming too acidic.

formate → H_{2} and CO_{2}

== Methyl red test ==
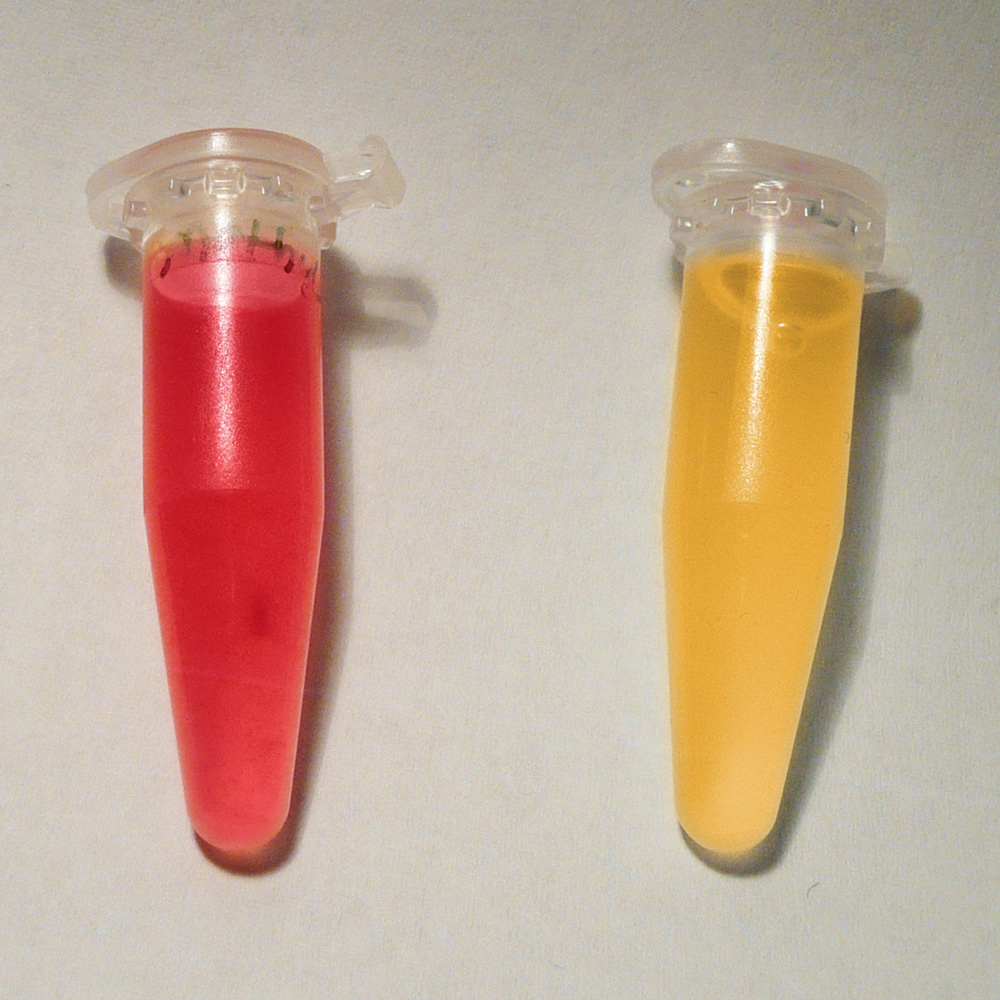
Methyl red test: The test tube on the left shows a positive result as acidic end products are formed by mixed acid fermentation in E. coli. The test tube on the right shows a negative result as no acidic products are formed by fermentation.

The methyl red (MR) test can detect whether the mixed acid fermentation pathway occurs in microbes when given glucose. A pH indicator is used that turns the test solution red if the pH drops below 4.4. If the fermentation pathway has taken place, the mixture of acids it has produced will make the solution very acidic and cause a red colour change.

The methyl red test belongs to a group known as the IMViC tests.

== Metabolic engineering ==
Multiple bacterial strains have been metabolically engineered to increase the individual yields of end products formed by mixed acid fermentation. For instance, strains for the increased production of ethanol, lactate, succinate and acetate have been developed due to the usefulness of these products in biotechnology. The major limiting factor for this engineering is the need to maintain a redox balance in the mixture of acids produced by the fermentation pathway.

=== For ethanol production ===
Ethanol is the most commonly used biofuel and can be produced on large scale via fermentation. The maximum theoretical yield for the production of ethanol was achieved around 20 years. A plasmid that carried the pyruvate decarboxylase and alcohol dehydrogenase genes from the bacteria Z. mobilis was used by scientists. This was inserted into E. coli and resulted in an increased yield of ethanol. The genome of this E. coli strain, KO11, has more recently been sequenced and mapped.

The skeletal formula of polylactic acid

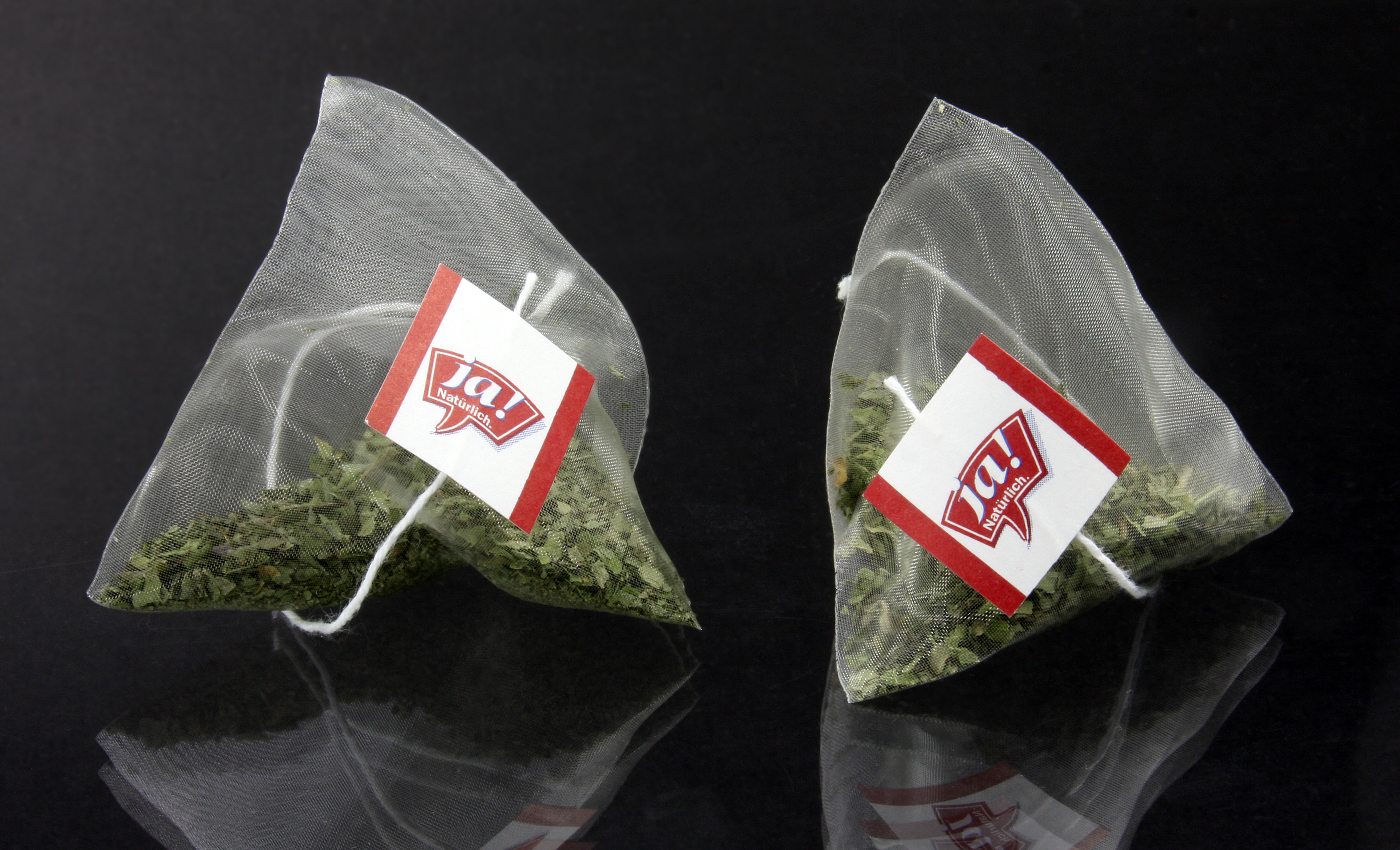
Teabags made from polylactic acid (PLA)

=== For acetate production ===
The E. coli strain W3110 was genetically engineered to generate 2 moles of acetate for every 1 mole of glucose that undergoes fermentation. This is known as a homoacetate pathway.

=== For lactate production ===
Lactate can be used to produce a bioplastic called polylactic acid (PLA). The properties of PLA depend on the ratio of the two optical isomers of lactate (D-lactate and L-lactate). D-lactate is produced by mixed acid fermentation in E. coli. Early experiments engineered the E. coli strain RR1 to produce either one of the two optical isomers of lactate.

Later experiments modified the E. coli strain KO11, originally developed to enhance ethanol production. Scientists were able to increase the yield of D-lactate from fermentation by performing several deletions.

=== For succinate production ===
Increasing the yield of succinate from mixed acid fermentation was first done by overexpressing the enzyme PEP carboxylase. This produced a succinate yield that was approximately 3 times greater than normal. Several experiments using a similar approach have followed.

Alternative approaches have altered the redox and ATP balance to optimize the succinate yield.

== Related fermentation pathways ==
There are a number of other fermentation pathways that occur in microbes. All these pathways begin by converting pyruvate, but their end products and the key enzymes they require are different. These pathways include:

- Ethanol fermentation
- Lactic acid fermentation
- Propionic acid fermentation
- Butanol fermentation
- Butanediol fermentation
