= Glucose phosphate broth =

Glucose phosphate broth is used to perform methyl red (MR) test and Voges–Proskauer test (VP).

== Contents ==
- Glucose – 5 g/L
- Dipotassium phosphate – 5 g/L
- Proteose Peptone – 5 g/L
- Distilled water – 1000 mL

pH – 6.9

== Methyl red test ==
=== Principle ===
It is used to determine the ability of an organism to produce mixed acids by fermentation of glucose and to overcome the buffering capacity of the medium.

=== Procedure ===
Inoculate MacConkey's (Glucose phosphate broth) with pure culture of test organism. Incubate the broth at 35 °C for 48–72 hours.

After incubation add 5 drops of methyl red directly into the broth, through the sides of the tube.

=== Interpretation ===
The development of stable red color in the surface of the medium indicates sufficient acid production to lower the pH to 4.4 and constitute a positive test. Since other organism may produce lesser quantities of acid from the test substrate, an intermediate orange color between yellow and red may develop. This does not indicate positive test.

=== Controls ===
Positive and negative controls should be run after preparation of each lot of medium.

Positive control: Escherichia coli

Negative control: Klebsiella

== Voges Proskauer test ==
=== Principle ===
It is used to determine the ability of some organisms to produce a neutral end product, acetyl methyl carbinol (acetoin) from glucose fermentation. The production of acetoin, a neutral reacting end product produced by members such as Klebsiella, Enterobacter etc., is the chief end product of glucose metabolism and form less quantities of mixed acids. In the presence of atmospheric oxygen and 40% KOH, acetoin is converted to diacetyl and α-naphthol serves as catalyst to bring out red color complex.

=== Media ===
Glucose Phosphate Broth

=== Reagents ===
A: α-naphthol – 5 g

- Absolute ethyl alcohol – 100 mL – 0.6 mL – 3 parts
- B: KOH – 40 g
- Distilled water – 100 mL – 0.2 mL – 1 part

=== Procedure ===
Inoculate a tube of glucose phosphate broth with a pure inoculum of test organism and incubate at 35 °C for 24 hours.

To 1 mL of this broth add 0.6 mL of 5% α-Naphthol followed by 0.2 mL of 40% KOH. Shake the tube gently to expose the medium to atmospheric oxygen and allow the tube to remain undisturbed for 10–15 minutes.

=== Interpretation ===
A positive test is represented by the development of red color in 15 minutes or more after addition of the reagents, indicating the presence of diacetyl, the oxidation product of acetoin. The test should be red, after standing for 1 hour because negative VP cultures may produce copper-like colour potentially resulting in a false positive interpretation, also because due to action of the reagents when mixed.

=== Controls ===
Positive and negative controls should be run after preparation of each lot of medium.

Positive control: Klebsiella

Negative control: Escherichia coli
