= DMAB =

DMAB can refer to:

- Designated Male At Birth, a sex assignment given at birth to identify a baby's sex
- para-Dimethylaminobenzaldehyde, an organic chemical compound
- Denosumab, a drug for treating osteoporosis
