= Voges–Proskauer test =

Microbiological and biochemical method for identification

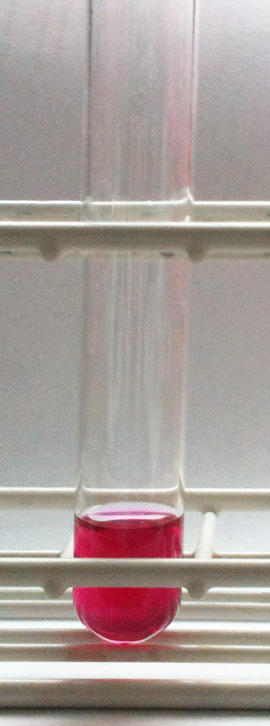
Enterobacter cloacae

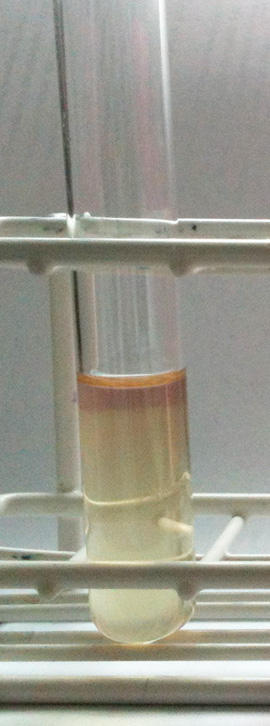
Proteus myxofaciens

Two bacterial broth cultures, showing a positive result (left side) and a negative result (right side) for the VP test.

Voges–Proskauer /ˈfoʊɡəs ˈprɒskaʊ.ər/ or VP is a test used to detect acetoin in a bacterial broth culture. The test is performed by adding alpha-naphthol and potassium hydroxide to the Voges-Proskauer broth, which is a glucose-phosphate broth that has been inoculated with bacteria. A cherry red color indicates a positive result, while a yellow-brown color indicates a negative result.

The test depends on the digestion of glucose to acetylmethylcarbinol. In the presence of oxygen and strong base, the acetylmethylcarbinol is oxidized to diacetyl, which then reacts with guanidine compounds commonly found in the peptone medium of the broth. Alpha-naphthol acts as a color enhancer, but the color change to red can occur without it.

Procedure: First, add the alpha-naphthol; then, add the potassium hydroxide. A reversal in the order of the reagents being added may result in a weak-positive or false-negative reaction.

VP is one of the four tests of the IMViC series, which tests for evidence of an enteric bacterium. The other three tests include: the indole test [I], the methyl red test [M], and the citrate test [C].

VP positive organisms include Enterobacter, Klebsiella, Serratia marcescens, Hafnia alvei, Vibrio cholerae biotype El Tor, and Vibrio alginolyticus.

VP negative organisms include Citrobacter sp., Shigella, Yersinia, Edwardsiella, Salmonella, Vibrio furnissii, Vibrio fluvialis, Vibrio vulnificus, and Vibrio parahaemolyticus.

== History ==
The reaction was developed by Daniel Wilhelm Otto Voges and Bernhard Proskauer, German bacteriologists in 1898 at the Institute for Infectious Diseases.
