= Amixetrine =

Chemical compound

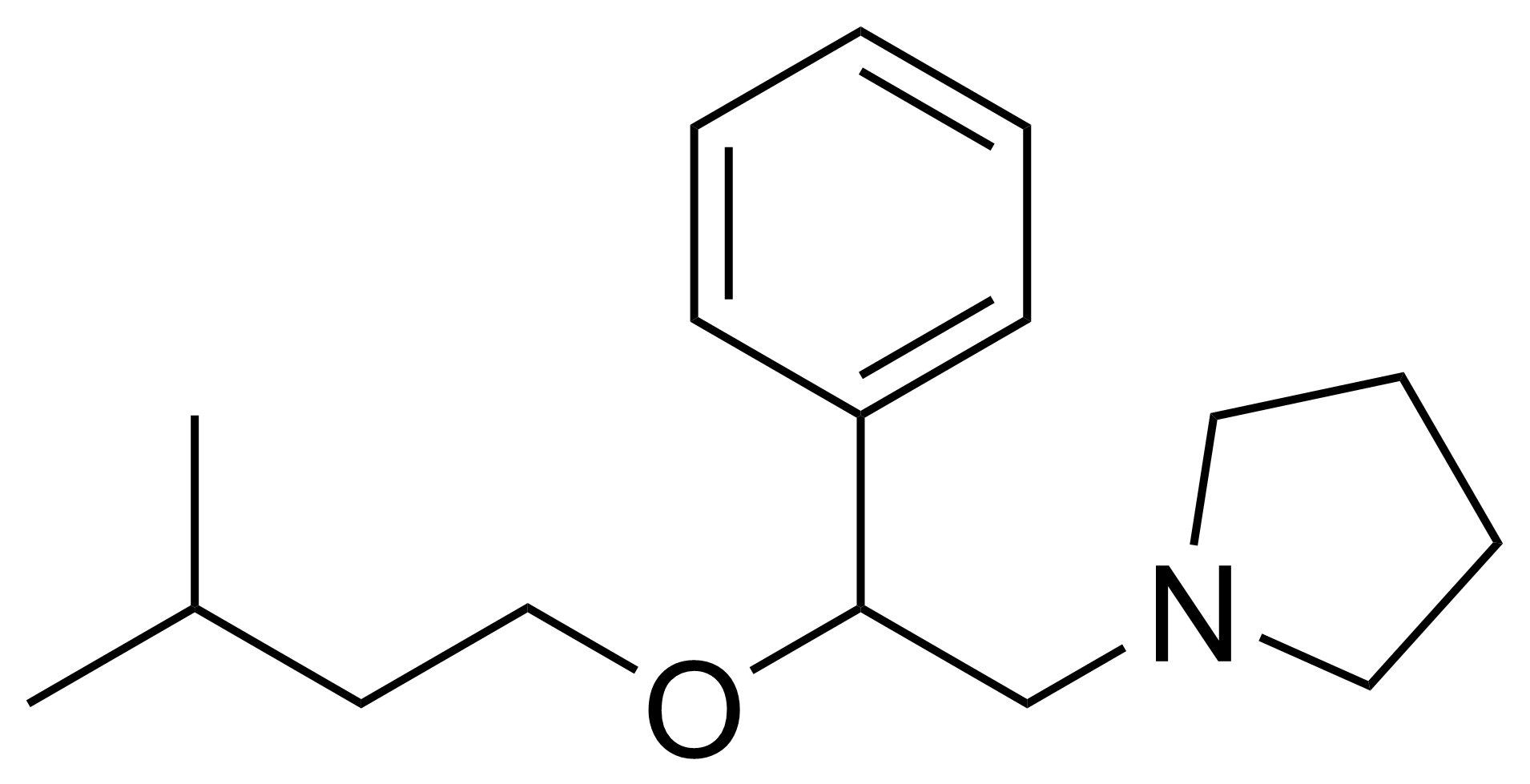

Clinical data
- Routes of administration: Oral
- ATC code: none

Legal status
- Legal status: In general: ℞ (Prescription only)

Identifiers
- IUPAC name: 1-[2-(3-methylbutoxy)-2-phenylethyl]pyrrolidine
- CAS Number: 24622-72-8
- PubChem CID: 71911
- ChemSpider: 64922
- UNII: 7UL287YTPJ
- ChEMBL: ChEMBL2104080
- CompTox Dashboard (EPA): DTXSID10865162

Chemical and physical data
- Formula: C_{17}H_{27}NO
- Molar mass: 261.409 g·mol^{−1}
- 3D model (JSmol): Interactive image
- SMILES: O(CCC(C)C)C(c1ccccc1)CN2CCCC2
- InChI: InChI=1S/C17H27NO/c1-15(2)10-13-19-17(14-18-11-6-7-12-18)16-8-4-3-5-9-16/h3-5,8-9,15,17H,6-7,10-14H2,1-2H3; Key:ISRODTBNJUAWEJ-UHFFFAOYSA-N

Amixetrine (INN; brand name Somagest; developmental code CERM-898) is a drug that was formerly marketed in France but is now no longer sold. According to various sources it has been said to be an anti-inflammatory, antidepressant, antispasmodic, anticholinergic, antihistamine, and antiserotonergic, but its definitive indications and pharmacology are unclear. The drug was first synthesized in 1969 and was introduced in France in 1972.

== Synthesis ==
The treatment of isoamyl alcohol (1) with styrene (2) at −10 °C with dropwise addition of tert-butyl hypobromite gives (2-bromo-1-(isopentyloxy)ethyl)benzene (3). Displacement of the halogen leaving group by pyrrolidine completes the synthesis of amixetrine (4).

Synthesis of amixetrine
