= Bernhard Proskauer =

German chemist (1851–1915)

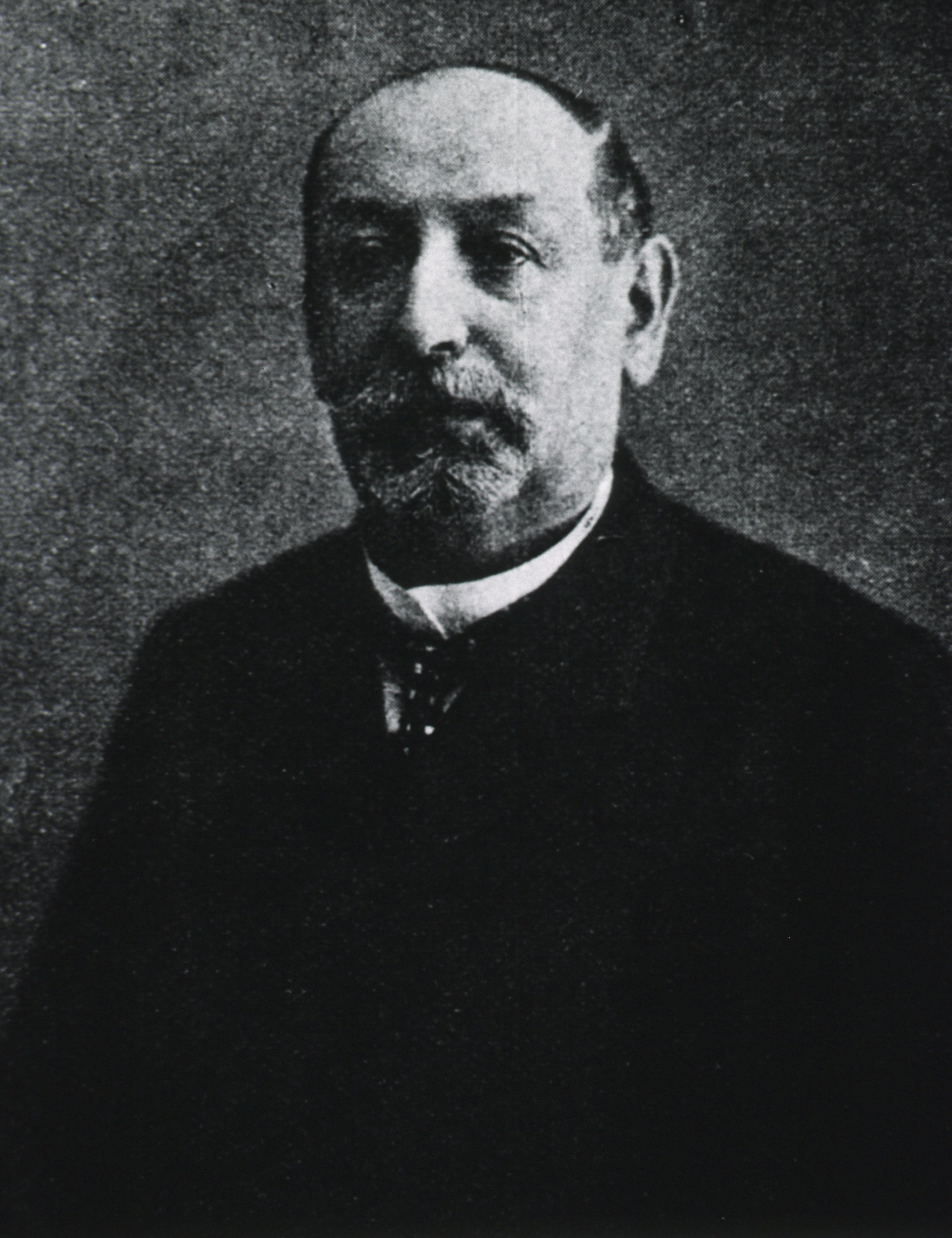
Bernhard Proskauer

Bernhard Proskauer (8 January 1851, Ratibor – 24 July 1915, Berlin) was a German chemist and hygienist.

He studied chemistry at the University of Berlin, and from 1874 worked as a chemist at the Imperial Health Office in Berlin. In 1885 he was named departmental head of the Institute of Hygiene at the university, attaining the title of professor in 1890. From 1891 he was associated with the Institute of Infectious Diseases, wherein 1901 he was named head of the department of chemistry. In 1907 he was appointed director of the Berlin Municipal Testing Office.

Much of Proskauer's research dealt with disinfections and water hygiene issues. With physician Daniel Wilhelm Otto Voges, he developed the Voges–Proskauer test, a chemical reaction used in testing for the production of acetoin by various bacteria.

With Richard Pfeiffer, he edited the Encyklopädie der Hygiene (2 volumes, 1902–1905).
