= Isoamyl alcohol =

Names
- Preferred IUPAC name 3-Methylbutan-1-ol
- Other names 3-Methyl-1-butanol; Isopentyl alcohol Isopentanol; Isobutylcarbinol

Identifiers
CAS Number	123-51-3
3D model (JSmol)	Interactive image
ChEBI	CHEBI:15837
ChEMBL	ChEMBL372396
ChemSpider	29000
DrugBank	DB02296
ECHA InfoCard	100.004.213
KEGG	C07328
PubChem CID	31260
UNII	DEM9NIT1J4
CompTox Dashboard (EPA)	DTXSID3025469
- InChI: InChI=1S/C5H12O/c1-5(2)3-4-6/h5-6H,3-4H2,1-2H3 Key: PHTQWCKDNZKARW-UHFFFAOYSA-N; InChI=1/C5H12O/c1-5(2)3-4-6/h5-6H,3-4H2,1-2H3 Key: PHTQWCKDNZKARW-UHFFFAOYAW
- SMILES: OCCC(C)C

Properties
Chemical formula	C_{5}H_{12}O
Molar mass	88.148 g/mol
Appearance	Clear, colorless liquid
Odor	Disagreeable odor in high concentrations
Density	0.8104 g/cm^{3} at 20 °C
Melting point	−117 °C (−179 °F; 156 K)
Boiling point	131.1 °C (268.0 °F; 404.2 K)
Solubility in water	Slightly soluble, 28 g/L
Solubility	Very soluble in acetone, diethyl ether, ethanol
Vapor pressure	28 mmHg (20 °C)
Magnetic susceptibility (χ)	−68.96·10^{−6} cm^{3}/mol
Viscosity	3.692 mPa·s

Thermochemistry
Heat capacity (C)	2.382 J/g·K
Std enthalpy of formation (Δ_{f}H^{⦵}_{298})	−356.4 kJ/mol (liquid) −300.7 kJ/mol (gas)

Hazards
- Occupational safety and health (OHS/OSH)
Main hazards	Flammable, moderately toxic
- GHS labelling
Pictograms	
Signal word	Danger
Hazard statements	H226, H302, H305, H315, H318, H332, H335
Precautionary statements	P210, P233, P240, P241, P242, P243, P261, P264, P270, P271, P280, P301+P312, P302+P352, P303+P361+P353, P304+P312, P304+P340, P305+P351+P338, P310, P312, P321, P330, P332+P313, P337+P313, P362, P370+P378, P403+P233, P403+P235, P405, P501
NFPA 704 (fire diamond)	1 2 0
Flash point	43 °C (109 °F; 316 K)
Autoignition temperature	350 °C (662 °F; 623 K)
Explosive limits	1.2–9%
- Lethal dose or concentration (LD, LC)
LD_{50} (median dose)	1453 mg/kg (rabbit, oral); 1300 mg/kg (rat, oral)
- NIOSH (US health exposure limits)
PEL (Permissible)	TWA 100 ppm (360 mg/m^{3})
REL (Recommended)	TWA 100 ppm (360 mg/m^{3}), ST 125 ppm (450 mg/m^{3})
IDLH (Immediate danger)	500 ppm
- Except where otherwise noted, data are given for materials in their standard state (at 25 °C [77 °F], 100 kPa). verify (what is ?) Infobox references

Isoamyl alcohol is a colorless liquid with the formula C_{5}H_{12}O, specifically (H_{3}C–)_{2}CH–CH_{2}–CH_{2}–OH. It is one of several isomers of amyl alcohol (pentanol). It is also known as isopentyl alcohol, isopentanol, or (in the IUPAC recommended nomenclature) 3-methylbutan-1-ol. An obsolete name for it is isobutyl carbinol.

Isoamyl alcohol is an ingredient in the production of banana oil, an ester found in nature and also produced as a flavouring in industry. It is a common fusel alcohol, produced as a major by-product of ethanol fermentation.

== Occurrence ==
Isoamyl alcohol is one of the components of the aroma of Tuber melanosporum, the black truffle.

Fusel alcohols like isoamyl alcohol are fermentation byproducts, and therefore trace amounts of isoamyl are present in many alcoholic beverages.

The compound has also been identified as a chemical in the pheromone used by hornets to attract other members of the hive to attack.

== Extraction from fusel oil ==
Isoamyl alcohol can be separated from fusel oil by either of two methods: shaking with strong brine solution and separating the oily layer from the brine layer; distilling it and collecting the fraction that boils between 125 and 140 °C. Further purification is possible with this procedure: shaking the product with hot limewater, separating the oily layer, drying the product with calcium chloride, and distilling it, collecting the fraction boiling between 128 and 132 °C.

== Synthesis ==
Isoamyl alcohol can be synthesized by condensation of isobutene and formaldehyde which produces isoprenol, then hydrogenation. It is a colourless liquid of density 0.8247 g/cm^{3} (0 °C), boiling at 131.6 °C, slightly soluble in water, and easily dissolved in organic solvents. It has a characteristic strong smell and a sharp burning taste.

== Reactions ==
On passing the vapour through a red-hot tube, it decomposes into acetylene, ethylene, propylene, and other compounds. It is oxidized by chromic acid to isovaleraldehyde, and it forms addition compounds crystals with calcium chloride and tin(IV) chloride.

== Uses ==
Besides its use in the synthesis of banana oil, isoamyl alcohol is also an ingredient of Kovac's reagent, used for the bacterial diagnostic indole test.

It is also used as an antifoaming agent in the chloroform isoamyl alcohol reagent.

Isoamyl alcohol is used in a phenol–chloroform extraction mixed with the chloroform to further inhibit RNase activity and prevent solubility of RNAs with long tracts of poly-adenine.

=== Drugs ===
IAA is also used as the reactant in the synthesis of the following list of drugs:

1. Amixetrine
2. Amoproxan
3. Camylofin
4. Fenetradil
