= Butanediol fermentation =

Chemical reaction

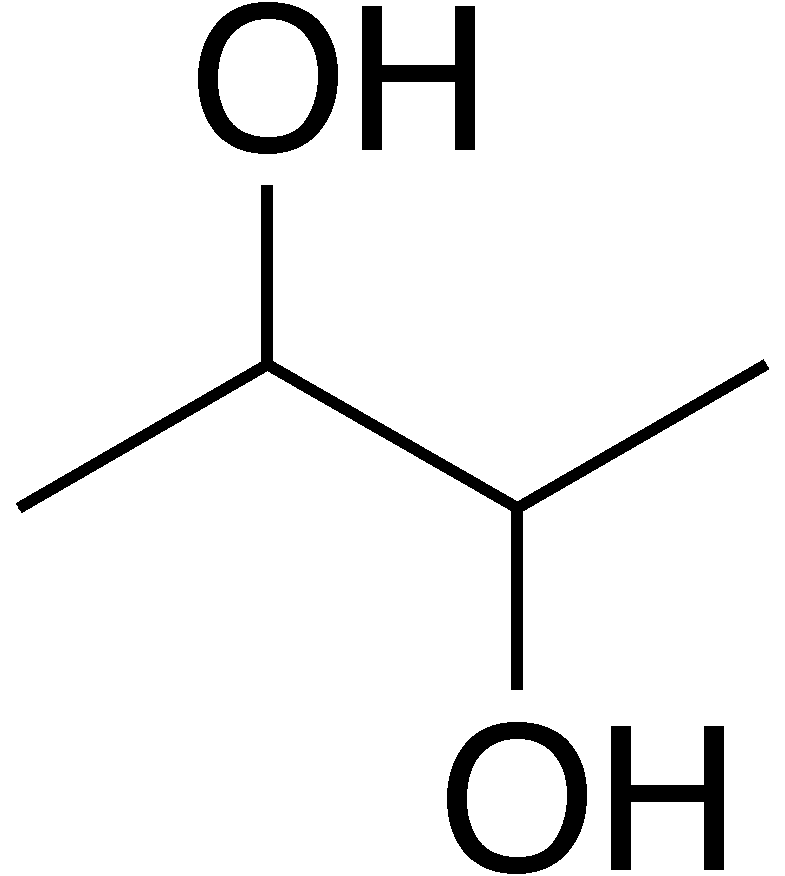
Figure 1: Chemical Structure of 2,3-Butanediol Fermentation

2,3-Butanediol fermentation is anaerobic fermentation of glucose with 2,3-butanediol as one of the end products. The overall stoichiometry of the reaction is

2 pyruvate + NADH --> 2CO_{2} + 2,3-butanediol.

Butanediol fermentation is typical for the facultative anaerobes Klebsiella and Enterobacter and is tested for using the Voges–Proskauer (VP) test. There are other alternative strains that can be used, talked about in details in the Alternative Bacteria Strains section below.

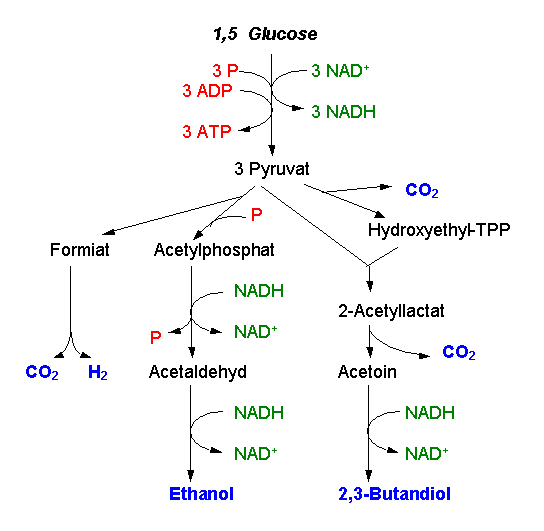
Figure 2: The fermentation process to produce butanediol

The metabolic function of 2,3-butanediol is not known, although some have speculated that it was an evolutionary advantage for these microorganisms to produce a neutral product that's less inhibitory than other partial oxidation products and doesn't reduce the pH as much as mixed acids.

There are many important industrial applications that butanediol can be used for, including antifreeze, food additives, antiseptics, and pharmaceuticals. It also is produced naturally in various places of the environment.

== Comparison with mixed acid fermentation ==
2,3-butanediol fermentation produces smaller amounts of acid than mixed acid fermentation, and butanediol, ethanol, CO_{2} and H_{2} are the end products. While equal amounts of CO_{2} and H_{2} are created during mixed acid fermentation, butanediol fermentation produces more than twice the amount of CO_{2} because the gases are not produced only by formate hydrogen lyase as they are in mixed acid fermentation.

2,3 Butanediol is produced at varying levels in aerated fermentations as long as the dissolved oxygen level is limiting (i.e., the culture is trying to consume more oxygen than is available). The degree of oxygen limitation dictates the ratios of 2,3-butanediol to by-products produced.

== Industrial applications ==
2,3-butanediol has a variety of industrial applications and products it can produce. The levo isomer of butanediol has a low freezing point of −60 °C, which allows it to work as an antifreeze agent. Through catalytic dehydrogenation, butanediol can form diacetyl. Diacetyl is a food additive that can be used to add flavor. 0.1% butanediol will kill most pathogenic bacteria due to its antiseptic properties. Through esterification, forms of precursors of polyurethane foams are produced. These can be used in various applications, including in pharmaceuticals, cosmetics, lotions, ointments, and antiperspirants. Butanediol itself even has applications in the pharmaceutical industry as a drug carrier.

== Alternative bacteria strains ==
Using mesophilic bacteria requires the fermentation process to occur below 40 °C, which can cause bacterial contamination due to the low temperature. On the industrial scale, this requires sterilization steps which means a special facility must be built, more employees are needed to run this extra step, and more energy is consumed at the plant. A novel aerobic Geobacillus strain XT15 has been shown to produce 2,3-butanediol at a temperature between 45 and 55 °C. This higher temperature will avoid the risk of contamination because microorganisms that live in normal environments cannot reproduce above 45 °C. The Geobacillus strain XT15 is thermophilic, which allows it to be able to operate fermentation at this higher temperature. Sterilization would not be necessary using this alternative strain making the manufacturing process more efficient and cost-effective.
