= Methyl red =

Chemical indicator that turns red in acidic solutions

- Skeletal formula of methyl red

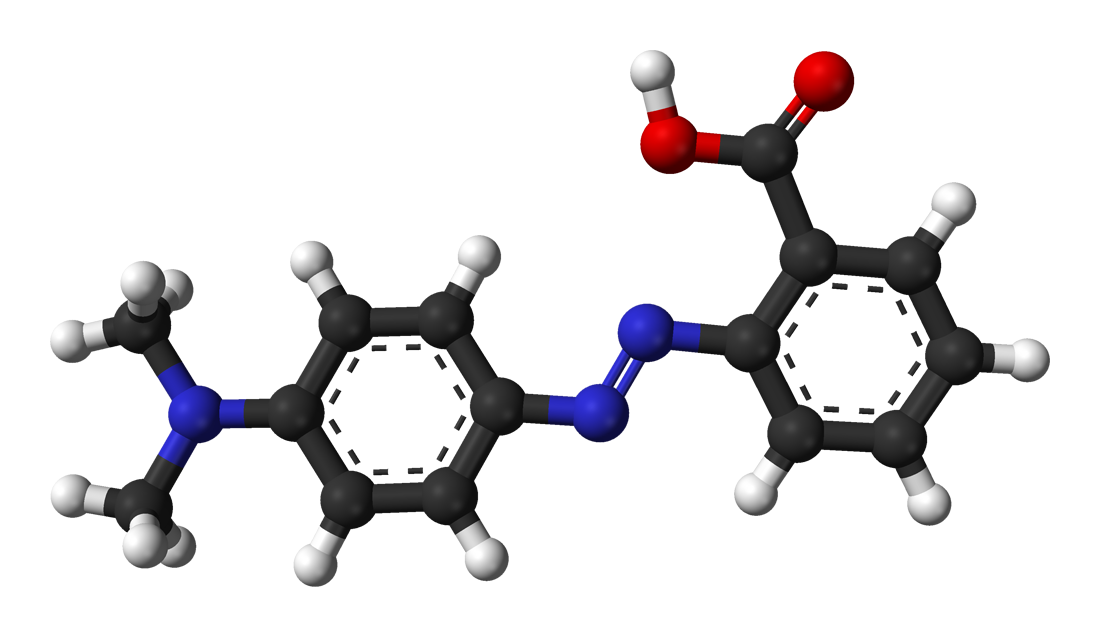
- Ball-and-stick model of methyl red

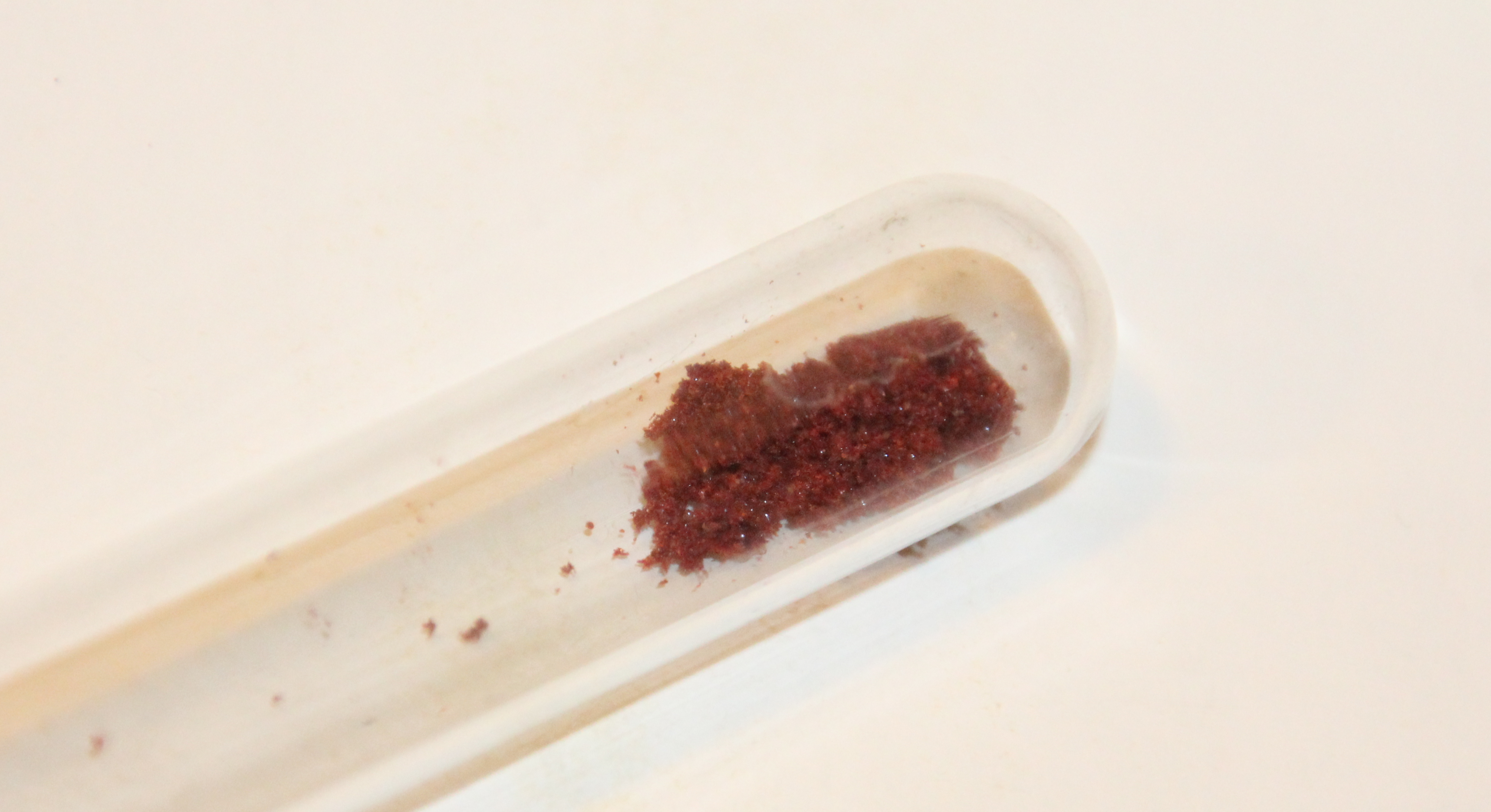

Names
- Preferred IUPAC name 2-{[4-(Dimethylamino)phenyl]diazenyl} benzoic acid

Identifiers
CAS Number	493-52-7 (free base); 63451-28-5 (HCl salt); 845-10-3 (sodium salt)
3D model (JSmol)	Interactive image
ChEBI	CHEBI:49770
ChemSpider	9881
ECHA InfoCard	100.007.070
EC Number	207-776-1
KEGG	C19459
PubChem CID	10303
RTECS number	DG8960000
UNII	69083AX1ZX (free base); RFA0W63690 (HCl salt); 311GZ0QHWN (sodium salt)
CompTox Dashboard (EPA)	DTXSID90859408 DTXSID1042154, DTXSID90859408
- InChI: InChI=1S/C15H15N3O2/c1-18(2)12-9-7-11(8-10-12)16-17-14-6-4-3-5-13(14)15(19)20/h3-10H,1-2H3,(H,19,20)/b17-16+ Key: CEQFOVLGLXCDCX-WUKNDPDISA-N; InChI=1/C15H15N3O2/c1-18(2)12-9-7-11(8-10-12)16-17-14-6-4-3-5-13(14)15(19)20/h3-10H,1-2H3,(H,19,20)/b17-16+ Key: CEQFOVLGLXCDCX-WUKNDPDIBD
- SMILES: CN(C)c2ccc(/N=N/c1ccccc1C(O)=O)cc2

Properties
Chemical formula	C_{15}H_{15}N_{3}O_{2}
Molar mass	269.304 g·mol^{−1}
Density	0.791 g/cm^{3}
Melting point	179–182 °C (354–360 °F; 452–455 K)
Solubility	soluble in ethanol
Acidity (pK_{a})	5.1
UV-vis (λ_{max})	410 nm (yellow form)

Hazards
- GHS labelling
Pictograms	(GHS08: Health hazard) (GHS09: Environmental hazard)
Signal word	Warning
Hazard statements	H351, H411
Precautionary statements	P201, P202, P273, P281, P308+P313, P391, P405, P501
NFPA 704 (fire diamond)	2 1 0
- Except where otherwise noted, data are given for materials in their standard state (at 25 °C [77 °F], 100 kPa). verify (what is ?) Infobox references

Methyl Red (pH indicator)
below pH 4.4		above pH 6.2
(red) 4.4	⇌	6.2 (yellow)

Methyl red (2-(N,N-dimethyl-4-aminophenyl) azobenzenecarboxylic acid), also called C.I. Acid Red 2, is an indicator dye that turns red in acidic solutions. It is an azo dye, and is a dark red crystalline powder. Methyl red is a pH indicator; it is red in pH under 4.4, yellow in pH over 6.2, and orange in between, with a pK_{a} of 5.1. Murexide and methyl red are investigated as promising enhancers of sonochemical destruction of chlorinated hydrocarbon pollutants. Methyl red is classed by the IARC in group 3 - unclassified as to carcinogenic potential in humans.

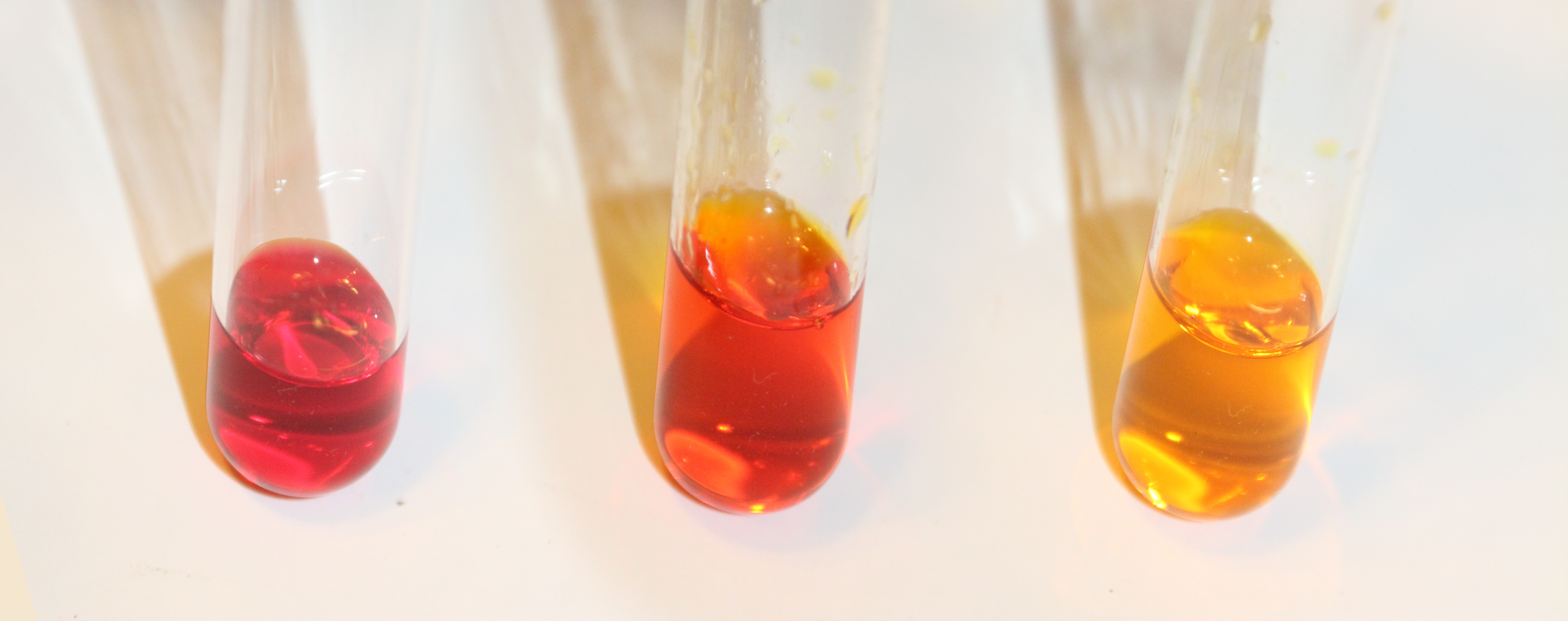
Color transition of methyl red solution under different acid–base conditions. Left: acidic, middle: about pH 5.1 (the pK_{a}), right: alkaline

== Preparation ==
As an azo dye, methyl red may be prepared by diazotization of anthranilic acid, followed by reaction with dimethylaniline:

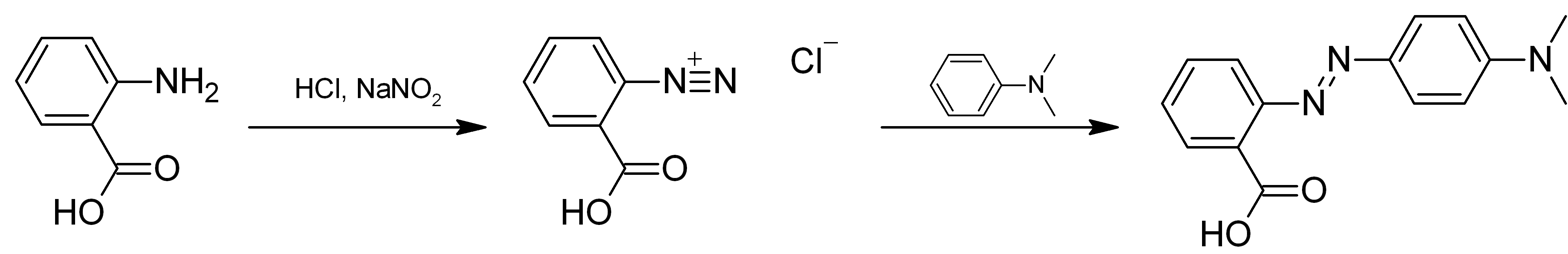

== Properties ==
The color of methyl red is pH dependent, because protonation causes it to adopt a hydrazone/quinone structure.

Methyl Red has a special use in histopathology for showing acidic nature of tissue and presence of organisms with acidic natured cell walls.

Methyl Red is detectably fluorescent in 1:1 water:methanol (pH 7.0), with an emission maximum at 375 nm (UVA) upon excitation with 310 nm light (UVB).

== Methyl red test ==
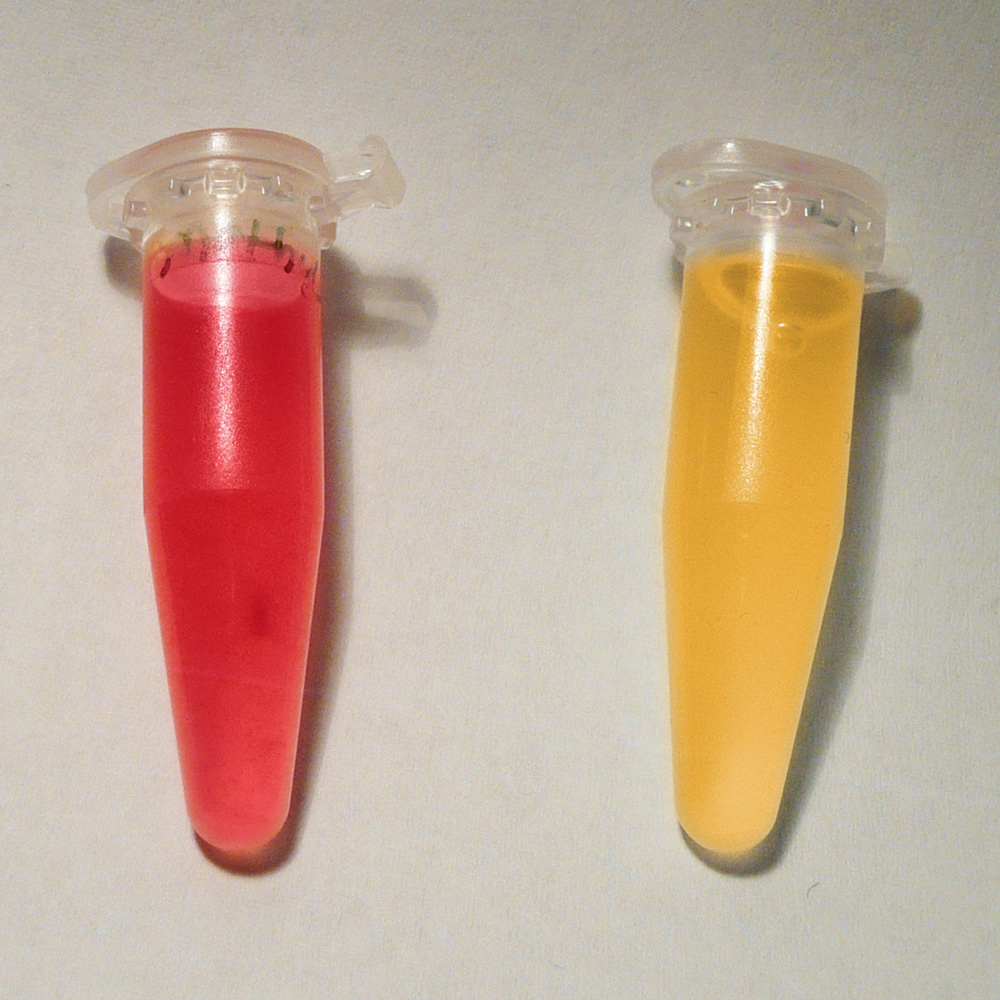
Methyl red test: Escherichia coli (left side) showing a 'positive' result, and Enterobacter cloacae (right side) showing a 'negative' result

In microbiology, methyl red is used in the methyl red test (MR test), used to identify bacteria producing stable acids by mechanisms of mixed acid fermentation of glucose (cf. Voges–Proskauer test).

The MR test, the "M" portion of the four IMViC tests, is used to identify enteric bacteria based on their pattern of glucose metabolism. All enterics initially produce pyruvic acid from glucose metabolism. Some enterics subsequently use the mixed acid pathway to metabolize pyruvic acid to other acids, such as lactic, acetic, and formic acids. These bacteria are called methyl-red positive and include Escherichia coli and Proteus vulgaris. Other enterics subsequently use the butylene glycol pathway to metabolize pyruvic acid to neutral end products. These bacteria are called methyl-red-negative and include Serratia marcescens and Enterobacter aerogenes.

=== Process ===
A tube filled with a glucose phosphate broth is inoculated with a sterile transfer loop. The tube is incubated at 35 °C (95 °F) for 2–5 days. After incubation, 2.5 ml of the medium are transferred to another tube. Five drops of the pH indicator methyl red is added to this tube then mixed.

=== Expected results ===
Enterics that subsequently metabolize pyruvic acid to other acids lower the pH of the medium to 4.2. At this pH, methyl red turns red, a positive test. Enterics that subsequently metabolize pyruvic acid to neutral end products lower the pH of the medium to only 6.0. At this pH, methyl red is yellow, a negative test.

== See also ==
- Chrysophenin
- Methyl
- Universal Indicator
- Tashiro's indicator
- pH indicators
- Methyl yellow
- Methyl orange
- Methyl violet
