= Kovács reagent =

Chemical mixture used in microbiology

Kovács reagent is a biochemical reagent consisting of isoamyl alcohol, para-dimethylaminobenzaldehyde (DMAB), and concentrated hydrochloric acid. It is used for the diagnostical indole test, to determine the ability of the organism to split indole from the amino acid tryptophan. The indole produced yields a red complex with para-dimethylaminobenzaldehyde under the given conditions. This was invented by the Hungarian physician Nicholas Kovács and was published in 1928. This reagent is used in the confirmation of E. coli and many other pathogenic microorganisms.

== See also ==
Ehrlich's reagent is similar but uses ethyl alcohol or 1-propyl alcohol.
