= Para-Dimethylaminobenzaldehyde =

para-Dimethylaminobenzaldehyde

Names
- Preferred IUPAC name 4-(Dimethylamino)benzaldehyde
- Other names p-Dimethylaminobenzaldehyde; 4-Formyl-N,N-dimethylaniline; N,N-Dimethyl-4-formylaniline; DMAB; PDAB

Identifiers
CAS Number	100-10-7
3D model (JSmol)	Interactive image
ChEBI	CHEBI:91114
ChemSpider	7199
ECHA InfoCard	100.002.563
EC Number	202-819-0
PubChem CID	7479
UNII	V7E88PR1YB
CompTox Dashboard (EPA)	DTXSID5021835
- InChI: InChI=1S/C9H11NO/c1-10(2)9-5-3-8(7-11)4-6-9/h3-7H,1-2H3 Key: BGNGWHSBYQYVRX-UHFFFAOYSA-N; InChI=1S/C9H11NO/c1-10(2)9-5-3-8(7-11)4-6-9/h3-7H,1-2H3
- SMILES: O=Cc1ccc(N(C)C)cc1

Properties
Chemical formula	C_{9}H_{11}NO
Molar mass	149.193 g·mol^{−1}
Appearance	yellow-white powder
Density	1.1 g/mL
Melting point	74 °C (165 °F; 347 K)
Boiling point	176 to 177 °C (349 to 351 °F; 449 to 450 K)
Solubility in water	0.3 g/L

Hazards
- GHS labelling
Pictograms	(GHS07: Exclamation mark) (GHS09: Environmental hazard)
Signal word	Warning
Hazard statements	H302, H317, H319, H411
Precautionary statements	P261, P264, P270, P272, P273, P280, P301+P312, P302+P352, P305+P351+P338, P321, P330, P333+P313, P337+P313, P363, P391, P501
Flash point	164 °C (327 °F; 437 K)
Safety data sheet (SDS)	External MSDS
- Except where otherwise noted, data are given for materials in their standard state (at 25 °C [77 °F], 100 kPa). verify (what is ?) Infobox references

para-Dimethylaminobenzaldehyde is an organic compound containing amine and aldehyde moieties which is used in Ehrlich's reagent and Kovac's reagent to test for indoles. The carbonyl group typically reacts with the electron rich 2-position of the indole but may also react at the C-3 or N-1 positions. It may also be used for determination of hydrazine.

== Ehrlich's reagent ==
para-Dimethylaminobenzaldehyde is the main ingredient in Ehrlich's reagent. It acts as a strong electrophile which reacts with the electron-rich α-carbon (2-position) of indole rings to form a blue-colored adduct. It can be used to detect the presence of indole alkaloids. Not all indole alkaloids give a colored adduct as result of steric hindrance which does not allow the reaction to proceed.

Ehrlich's reagent is also used as a stain in thin layer chromatography and as a reagent to detect urobilinogen in fresh, cool urine. If a urine sample is left to oxidize in air to form urobilin the reagent will not detect the urobilinogen. By adding few drops of reagent to 3 mL of urine in a test tube one can see a change of color, to dark pink or red. The degree of color change is proportional to the amount of urobilinogen in the urine sample.

== Hydrazine determination ==
p-Dimethylaminobenzaldehyde reacts with hydrazine to form p-Dimethylaminobenzalazine azo-dye which has a distinct yellow color. It is therefore used for spectrophotometric determination of hydrazine in aqueous solutions at 457 nm.

== Isaac Asimov essay ==
Isaac Asimov, in a 1963 humorous essay entitled "You, too, can speak Gaelic", reprinted in the anthology Adding a Dimension among others, traces the etymology of each component of the chemical name "para-di-methyl-amino-benz-alde-hyde" (e.g. the syllable "-benz-" ultimately derives from the Arabic lubān jāwī (لبان جاوي, "frankincense from Java"). Asimov points out that the name can be pronounced to the tune of the familiar jig "The Irish Washerwoman", and relates an anecdote in which a receptionist of Irish descent, hearing him singing the syllables thus, mistook them for the original Gaelic words to the jig. This essay inspired Jack Carroll's 1963 filk song "The Chemist's Drinking Song," (NESFA Hymnal Vol. 2 2nd ed. p. 65) set to the tune of that jig, which begins "Paradimethylaminobenzaldehyde, / Sodium citrate, ammonium cyanide, / ..."

== See also ==
- Paul Ehrlich
