= Simmons' citrate agar =

Differential culture medium

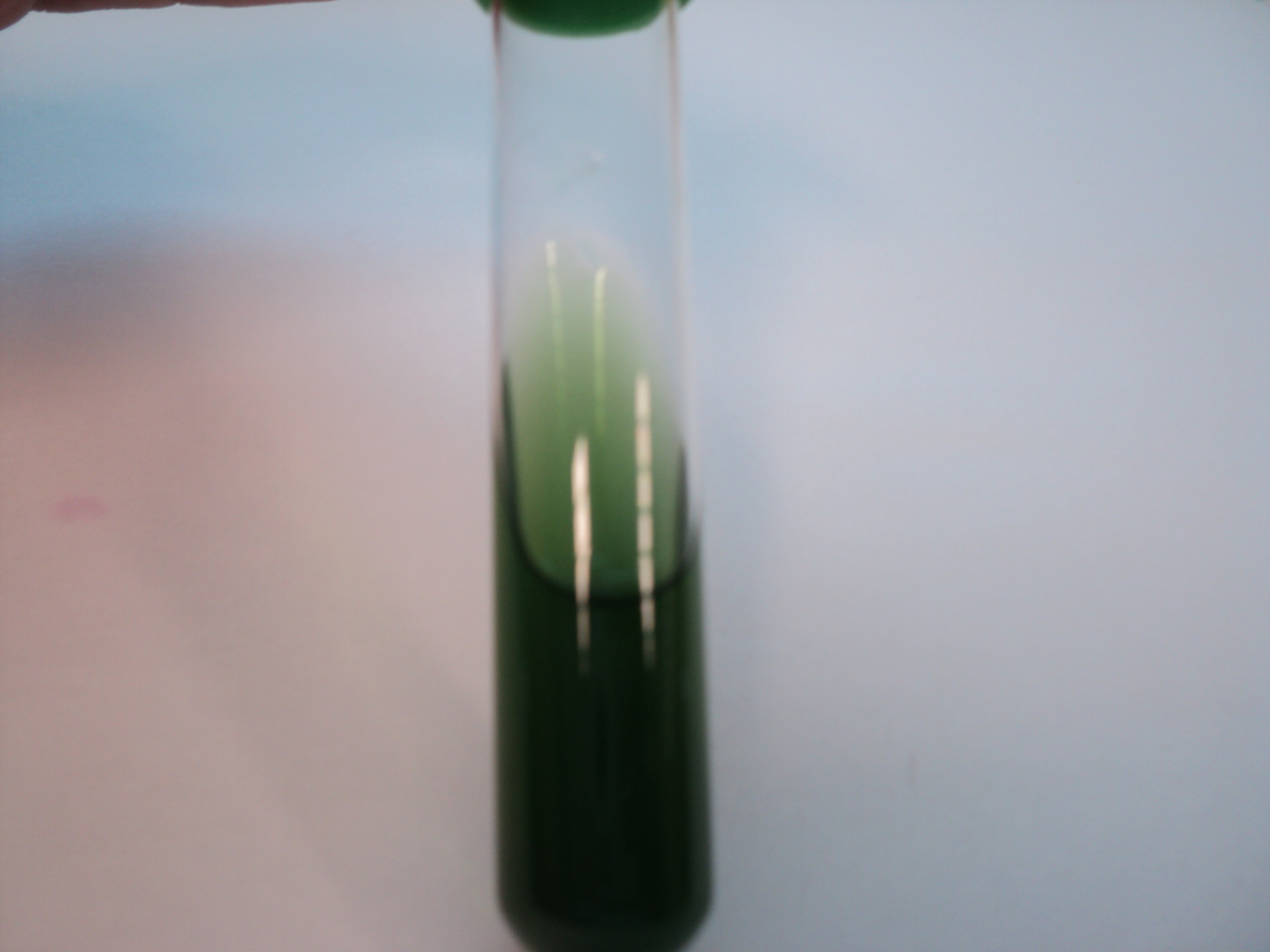
Simmons' citrate agar (not planted yet)

Simmons' citrate agar is used for differentiating gram-negative bacteria on the basis of citrate utilization, especially for distinguishing Gammaproteobacteria of the family Enterobacteriaceae or even between species of the same genus. For example, Salmonella enteritidis would yield a positive (blue) result on Simmons’ agar and thus be distinguished from other Salmonella species like Salmonella typhi, Salmonella pullorum, and Salmonella gallinarum, which would yield a negative (green) result.

One common application for Simmons’ agar is to monitor food or water for fecal contamination, which is indicated by the presence of fecal coliforms in the Enterobacterales order such as E. coli. In a sample, E. coli, which is citrate-negative, can be distinguished from non-fecal, citrate-positive coliforms that are often found in water, soil, and on plants using Simmons’ agar. Additionally, Simmons’ agar is commonly used as part of the IMViC tests to identify coliforms.

It is useful for selecting for organisms that use citrate as its main carbon and energy source. It is a defined, selective and differential medium that tests for an organism's ability to use citrate as a sole carbon source and ammonium ions as the sole nitrogen source. After citrate enters a cell through citrate permeases, citrate lyase cleaves it into acetate and oxaloacetate, which is further broken down into carbon dioxide and pyruvate. Depending on the pH of the cell, pyruvate can turn into acetate and formate at pH above 7, or acetate + lactate + carbon dioxide and acetoin + carbon dioxide at pH 7 and below. When water and sodium carbonate in the agar reacts with carbon dioxide released in citrate metabolism, alkaline products form and raise the pH, leading to the agar changing color from green to blue.

The medium contains sodium chloride, sodium citrate, ammonium dihydrogen phosphate, dipotassium phosphate, and magnesium sulphate. It also contains bromothymol blue, a pH indicator. Bromothymol blue is green at pH below 6.9, and then turns blue at a pH of 7.6 or greater.

== History ==
Simmons’ citrate agar was developed by James S. Simmons in 1926 by adding 1.5% agar and bromothymol blue as a pH indicator to Koser’s citrate agar to observe changes in pH as a result of oxidative reactions from citrate metabolism. Koser’s agar, developed by Stewart A. Koser in 1923, is a clear, colorless agar that allows the observation of bacterial growth by turbidity. With a colorless agar, misinterpreting negative results as positives is more common, which can be reduced by Simmons’ modification of adding bromothymol blue.

== Composition ==
The medium is prepared in 1 litre of deionized water at pH 6.9 ± 0.2 (at 25°C) with the following composition,

Ingredients	Grams per litre
Sodium chloride	5
Sodium Citrate	2
Ammonium dihydrogen phosphate	1
Dipotassium phosphate	1
Magnesium sulfate	0.2
Bromothymol blue	0.08
Agar	15

== Preparation ==
Although it could be used in other formats (e.g., Petri plates), Simmons' citrate agar is often used in slants or slopes in test tubes. One advantage of using slants over Petri dishes is access to oxygen, which is required by citrate metabolism. Simmons’ agar can be bought from suppliers as ready-made powders or slants. A slant is prepared by adding the heated agar to a test tube and allowing it to solidify at a slanted angle. To transfer cells from a sample to the agar, a sterilized needle is used to select a distinct colony from the sample and to streak across the agar surface, as is done on an agar plate. It is important to prepare a light cell inoculum because carry-over of nutrients or dead bacterial cell matter containing carbon and nitrogen from the inoculum might produce false positive results. Using a needle to transfer a cell sample can reduce carrying over extra inoculum.

== Interpretation ==
Organisms growing on Simmons' citrate agar are capable of using citrate as the sole carbon source and they can metabolize the ammonium salt in the medium (serving as a sole nitrogen source for growth).

Use of citrate results in the creation of carbonates and bicarbonates as byproducts. Organisms degrading citrate must also use the ammonium salts, producing ammonia, thus increasing the pH of the medium. The increase in pH then causes color change in the bromothymol blue indicator, turning it blue. Under neutral conditions the medium remains a green color. The color change to blue is useful because growth on Simmons' citrate agar is often limited and would be hard to observe if it were not for the color change.

Sometimes, it is possible to detect growth on the Simmons' citrate agar without the accompanying color change to blue. This should be scored as a negative for the citrate use test. Bacteria such as Salmonella and Providencia develop on such mediums.
