= Zymomonas mobilis =

Scientific classification
- Domain: Bacteria
- Kingdom: Pseudomonadati
- Phylum: Pseudomonadota
- Class: Alphaproteobacteria
- Order: Sphingomonadales
- Family: Zymomonadaceae; Hördt et al. 2020
- Genus: Zymomonas; Kluyver and van Niel 1936 (Approved Lists 1980)
- Species: Z. mobilis

Binomial name
- Zymomonas mobilis (Lindner 1928) De Ley and Swings 1976

Subspecies
- Zymomonas mobilis subsp. francensis Coton et al. 2006; Zymomonas mobilis subsp. mobilis (Lindner 1928) De Ley and Swings 1976; Zymomonas mobilis subsp. pomaceae (Millis 1956) De Ley and Swings 1976

Synonyms
- Achromobacter anaerobium [sic] Shimwell 1937; Pseudomonas lindneri Kluyver and Hoppenbrouwers 1931; Saccharomonas lindneri (Kluyver and Hoppenbrouwers 1931) Shimwell 1950; Thermobacterium mobile Lindner 1928; Zymomonas anaerobia (Shimwell 1937) Kluyver 1957; Zymomonas mobile [sic] (Lindner 1928) Kluyver and van Niel 1936

Species of bacterium

Zymomonas mobilis is a Gram negative, facultative anaerobic, non-sporulating, polarly-flagellated, rod-shaped bacterium. It is the only species found in the genus Zymomonas. It has notable bioethanol-producing capabilities, which surpass yeast in some aspects. It was originally isolated from alcoholic beverages like the African palm wine, the Mexican pulque, and also as a contaminant of cider and beer (cider sickness and beer spoilage) in European countries.

== Beer spoilage ==
Zymomonas is an unwanted waterborn bacteria in beer, creating an estery-sulfury flavor due to the production of acetaldehyde and hydrogen sulfide. This can be likened to a rotten apple smell or fruity odor. Zymomonas have not been reported in lager breweries due to the low temperatures (8–12 °C) and stringent carbohydrate requirements (able to ferment only sucrose, glucose, and fructose). It is commonly found in cask-conditioned ales where priming sugar is used to carbonate the beer. The optimum growth temperature is 25 to 30 °C.

== Ethanol production ==
Zymomonas mobilis degrades sugars to pyruvate using the Entner–Doudoroff pathway. The pyruvate is then fermented to produce ethanol and carbon dioxide as the only products (analogous to yeast).

The advantages of Z. mobilis over S. cerevisiae with respect to producing bioethanol:

- higher sugar uptake and ethanol yield (up to 2.5 times higher),
- lower biomass production,
- higher ethanol tolerance up to 16% (v/v),
- does not require controlled addition of oxygen during the fermentation,

However, in spite of these attractive advantages, several factors prevent the commercial usage of Z. mobilis in cellulosic ethanol production. The foremost hurdle is that its substrate range is limited to glucose, fructose and sucrose. Wild-type Z. mobilis cannot ferment C5 sugars like xylose and arabinose which are important components of lignocellulosic hydrolysates. Unlike E. coli and yeast, Z. mobilis cannot tolerate toxic inhibitors present in lignocellulosic hydrolysates such as acetic acid and various phenolic compounds. Concentration of acetic acid in lignocellulosic hydrolysates can be as high as 1.5% (w/v), which is well above the tolerance threshold of Z. mobilis.

Several attempts have been made to engineer Z. mobilis to overcome its inherent deficiencies. National Renewable Energy Laboratory (NREL), in the United States has made significant contributions in expanding its substrate range to include C5 sugars like xylose and arabinose. Acetic acid resistant strains of Z. mobilis have been developed by rational metabolic engineering efforts, mutagenesis techniques or adaptive mutation. However, when these engineered strains metabolize mixed sugars in presence of inhibitors, the yield and productivity are much lower, thus preventing their industrial application.

An extensive adaptation process was used to improve xylose fermentation in Z. mobilis. By adapting a strain in a high concentration of xylose, significant alterations of metabolism occurred. One noticeable change was reduced levels of xylitol, a byproduct of xylose fermentation which can inhibit the strain’s xylose metabolism. One of the reasons for lower xylitol production was mutation in a putative gene encoding for an aldo-keto reductase that catalyzes the reduction of xylose to xylitol.

Z. mobilis's plasma membrane contains hopanoids, pentacyclic compounds similar to eukaryotic sterols. This allows it to have an extraordinary tolerance to ethanol in its environment, around 13%.

Z. mobilis is traditionally used to make pulque.

== Genome ==
The genome of Z. mobilis strain ZM4 has been sequenced and contains 2,056,416 bp encoding 1,998 protein coding genes. This revealed that Z. mobilis can only metabolise glucose via the Entner–Doudoroff pathway and is not capable of using the Embden–Meyerhof–Parnas pathway.
