= Citrate test =

Biochemical test in microbiology

The citrate test detects the ability of an organism to use citrate as the sole source of carbon and energy.

== Principle ==
Bacteria are inoculated on a medium containing sodium citrate and a pH indicator such as bromothymol blue. The medium also contains inorganic ammonium salts, which are utilized as sole source of nitrogen. Use of citrate involves the enzyme citrate lyase, which breaks down citrate to oxaloacetate and acetate. Oxaloacetate is further broken down to pyruvate and carbon dioxide (CO_{2}). Production of sodium bicarbonate (NaHCO_{3}) as well as ammonia (NH_{3}) from the use of sodium citrate and ammonium salts results in alkaline pH. This results in a change of the medium's color from green (neutral) to blue (alkaline).

Bacterial colonies are picked up from a straight wire and inoculated into slope of Simmon's citrate agar and incubated overnight at 37 °C. Inoculating from a broth culture is not recommended because the inoculum would be too heavy. If the organism has the ability to use citrate, the medium usually changes its color from green to blue, though growth on the medium even without colour change is considered a positive result. An observation of no growth is a negative result.

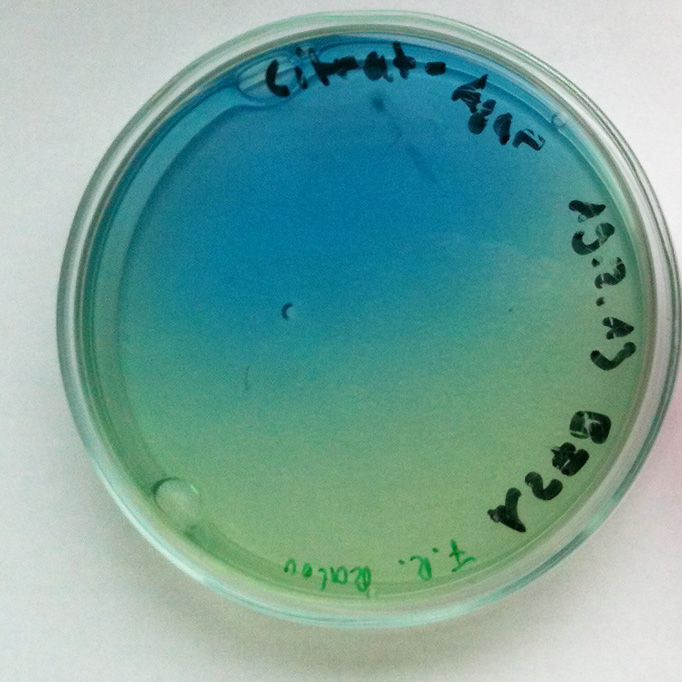
Raoultella planticola

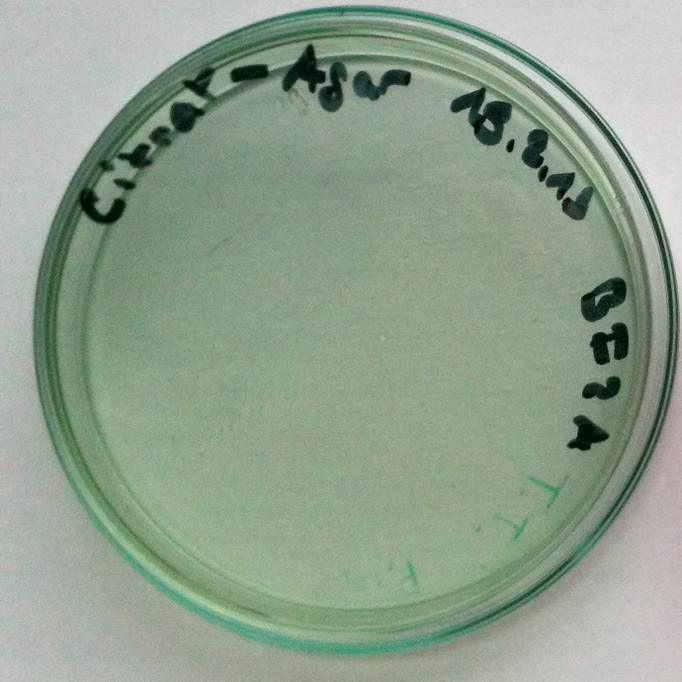
Proteus myxofaciens

Two bacteria (both Enterobacteriaceae) on citrate agar, showing a positive result (left side) and a negative result (right side) for the citrate test.

Examples:

- Escherichia coli: Negative
- Klebsiella pneumoniae: Positive
- Frateuria aurantia: Positive
