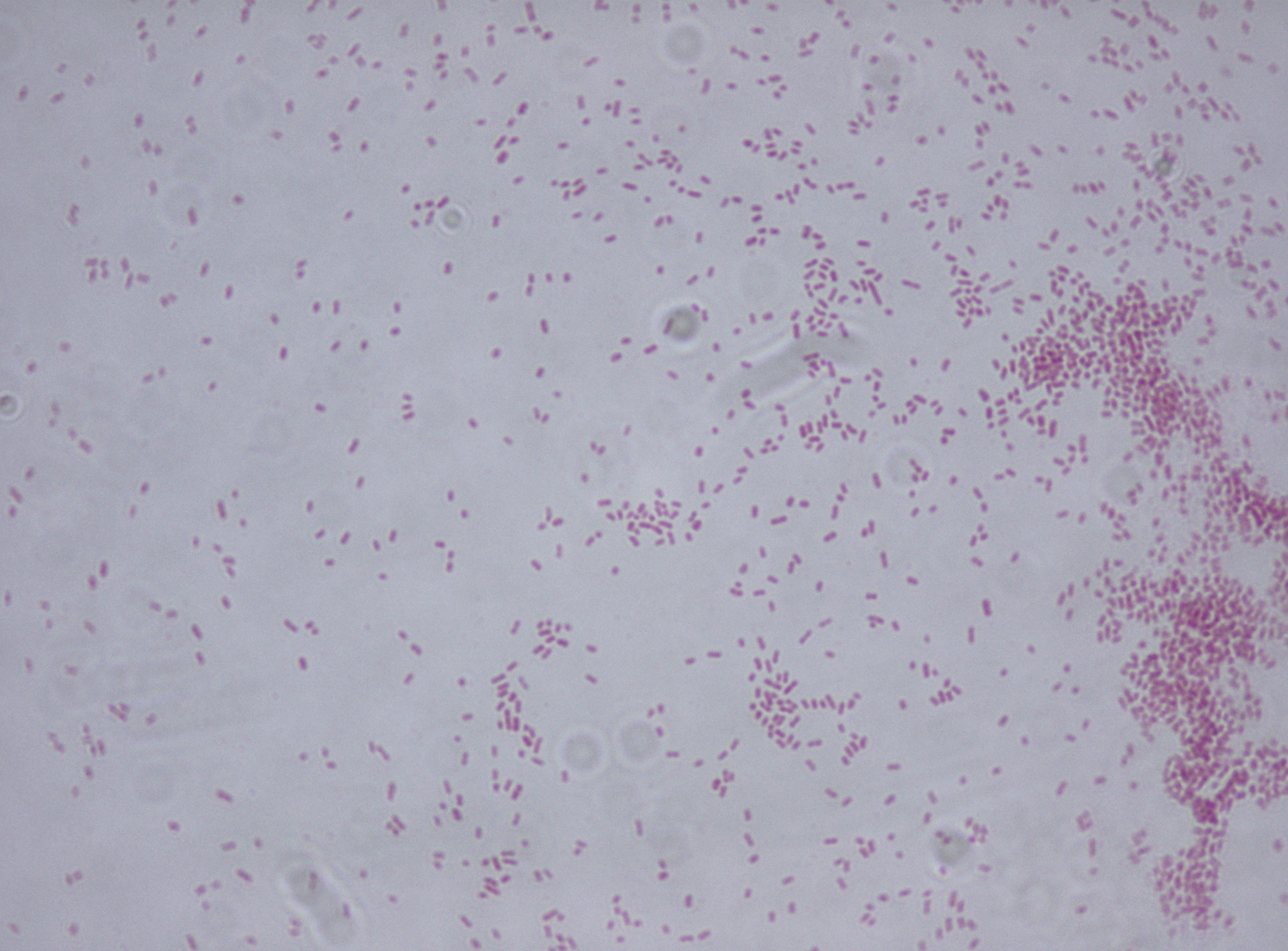

Scientific classification
- Domain: Bacteria
- Kingdom: Pseudomonadati
- Phylum: Pseudomonadota
- Class: Gammaproteobacteria
- Order: Enterobacterales
- Family: Enterobacteriaceae
- Genus: Klebsiella
- Species: K. aerogenes

Binomial name
- Klebsiella aerogenes Tindall et al., 2017

Synonyms
- Klebsiella mobilis Bascomb et al. 1971; Enterobacter aerogenes Hormaeche and Edwards, 1960; Bacterium aerogenes Breed and Conn, 1935

= Klebsiella aerogenes =

Species of bacterium

Lab findings
- Gram: negative
- Shape: rods
- Hemolysis: negative
- Oxidase: negative
- Catalase: positive
- Indole: negative
- Citrate: positive

Klebsiella aerogenes, previously known as Enterobacter aerogenes, is a Gram-negative, oxidase-negative, catalase-positive, citrate-positive, indole-negative, rod-shaped bacterium. Capable of motility via peritrichous flagella, it is approximately one to three microns in length. The bacterium is found in the normal flora of the human gastrointestinal tract.

Klebsiella aerogenes is a nosocomial, pathogenic bacterium that causes opportunistic infections of most types. Infections are generally sensitive to antibiotics designed for this bacteria class, though complicated by inducible resistance mechanisms, particularly β- lactamase; infections accordingly become quickly resistant to standard antibiotics during treatment, necessitating a change in antibiotic to avoid worsening of the sepsis.

Some infections caused by K. aerogenes result from specific antibiotic treatments, venous catheter insertions, and/or surgical procedures. It is generally found in the human gastrointestinal tract and does not generally cause disease in healthy individuals. It has been found to live in various wastes, hygiene chemicals, and soil. It also has some commercial significance; experiments using molasses as the substrate have produced hydrogen gas.

K. aerogenes is an outstanding hydrogen producer. It is an anaerobic facultative and mesophilic bacterium that can consume different sugars, and—unlike the cultivation of strict anaerobes—there is no requirement to remove all oxygen from the fermenter. Along with a short doubling time, it has a high hydrogen productivity and evolution rate. Furthermore, its hydrogen production is not inhibited at high hydrogen partial pressures. Its hydrogen yield is lower than that of such strict anaerobes as Clostridia: strictly anaerobic bacteria produce a theoretical maximum of 4 mol H_{2}/mol glucose, while such facultative anaerobic bacteria as K. aerogenes theoretically yield a maximum of 2 mol H_{2}/mol glucose.

K. aerogenes may spoil maple sap and syrup.

Owing to diverse metabolites—acids and alcohols—produced by such a strain in conjunction with its ability to utilize different sugars, the metabolism and growth of K. aerogenes can vary significantly with the conditions.

== Biochemical identification test results ==
| Identification Method | Test Result |
|---|---|
| Motility | Positive |
| Indole | Negative |
| Methyl Red | Negative |
| VP | Positive |
| Citrate (Simmons) | Positive |
| Nitrate Reduction | Negative |
| Hydrogen Sulfide (TSI) | Negative |
| Urea Hydrolysis | Negative |
| Oxidase | Negative |
| Phenylalanine Deaminase | Negative |
| Eosin-methylene blue | Positive |
| Glucose Fermentation | Acid/Gas |
| Lactose Fermentation | Acid/Gas |
| Sucrose Fermentation | Acid/Gas |
| Mannitol Fermentation | Acid/Gas |
| Growth in KCN | Positive |
| Ornithinine Decarboxylase | Positive |
| Gelatin Hydrolysis (22 °C) | Negative o |
