= Klebsiella huaxiensis =

Scientific classification
- Domain: Bacteria
- Kingdom: Pseudomonadati
- Phylum: Pseudomonadota
- Class: Gammaproteobacteria
- Order: Enterobacterales
- Family: Enterobacteriaceae
- Genus: Klebsiella
- Species: K. huaxiensis

Binomial name
- Klebsiella huaxiensis Hu et al. 2019

Species of bacterium

Klebsiella huaxiensis is a pathogenic gram-negative bacterium in the family Enterobacteriaceae. It is gas-producing, non-motile, and does not form spores.

The bacterium has the ability to grow on trypticase soy agar, Mueller–Hinton agar, lysogeny broth agar, and brain heart infusion agar. 24 hours of incubation at 37 °C is required for colonies to grow on BHI agar. The colonies are "light yellow, circular, smooth, convex, glistening, with entire margins."

Klebsiella huaxiensis is characterized by being negative for malonate, urease, ornithine decarboxylase, and the Voges–Proskauer test. The bacterium is positive for indole, lysine, decarboxylase, lactose, mannitol, and ONPG.

Klebsiella huaxiensis has been isolated from the urinary tract of humans. The earliest recorded encounter with this pathogen was in 2017 at West China Medical Center of Sichuan University. The pathogen was discovered in a urine sample of a patient suffering from a urinary tract infection.

While distinct, K. huaxiensis has 76.86%-87.18% average nucleotide identity with strains from all known Klebsiella and Raoultella species. Genome analysis reveals that the GC-content of K. huaxiensis is 53.3%.

Due to the phenotypic characteristics of K. huaxiensis, the bacterium is clustered with species in the Klebsiella oxytoca phylogroup. The phylogroup includes K. grimontii, K. michiganensis, and K. oxytoca. Through 16S RNA sequences, K. huaxiensis has been found to be the most similar to K. oxytoca (98.5%). The distinct difference between K. huaxiensis and the rest of the K. oxytoca phylogroup is that it has a negative Voges-Proskauer reaction.
