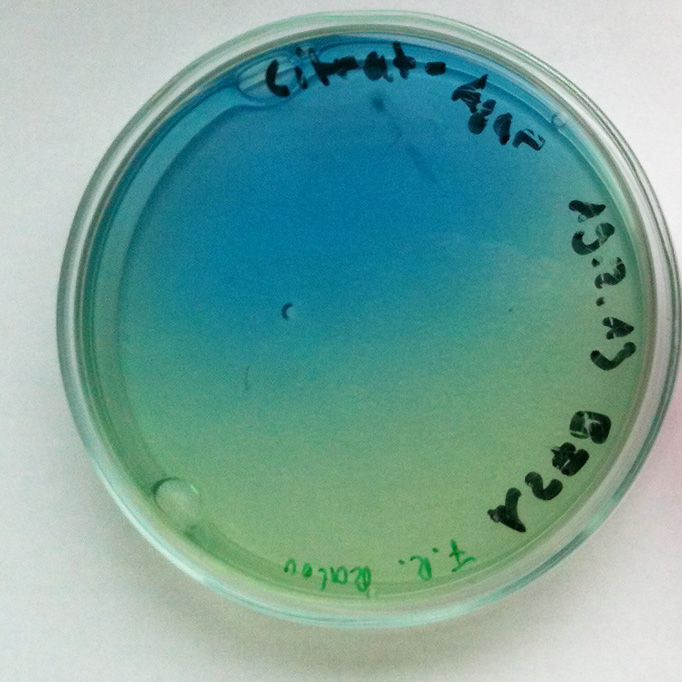

Scientific classification
- Domain: Bacteria
- Kingdom: Pseudomonadati
- Phylum: Pseudomonadota
- Class: Gammaproteobacteria
- Order: Enterobacterales
- Family: Enterobacteriaceae
- Genus: Raoultella
- Species: R. planticola

Binomial name
- Raoultella planticola Bagley et al. 1982

Synonyms
- Klebsiella planticola, Klebsiella trevisanii

= Raoultella planticola =

Species of bacterium

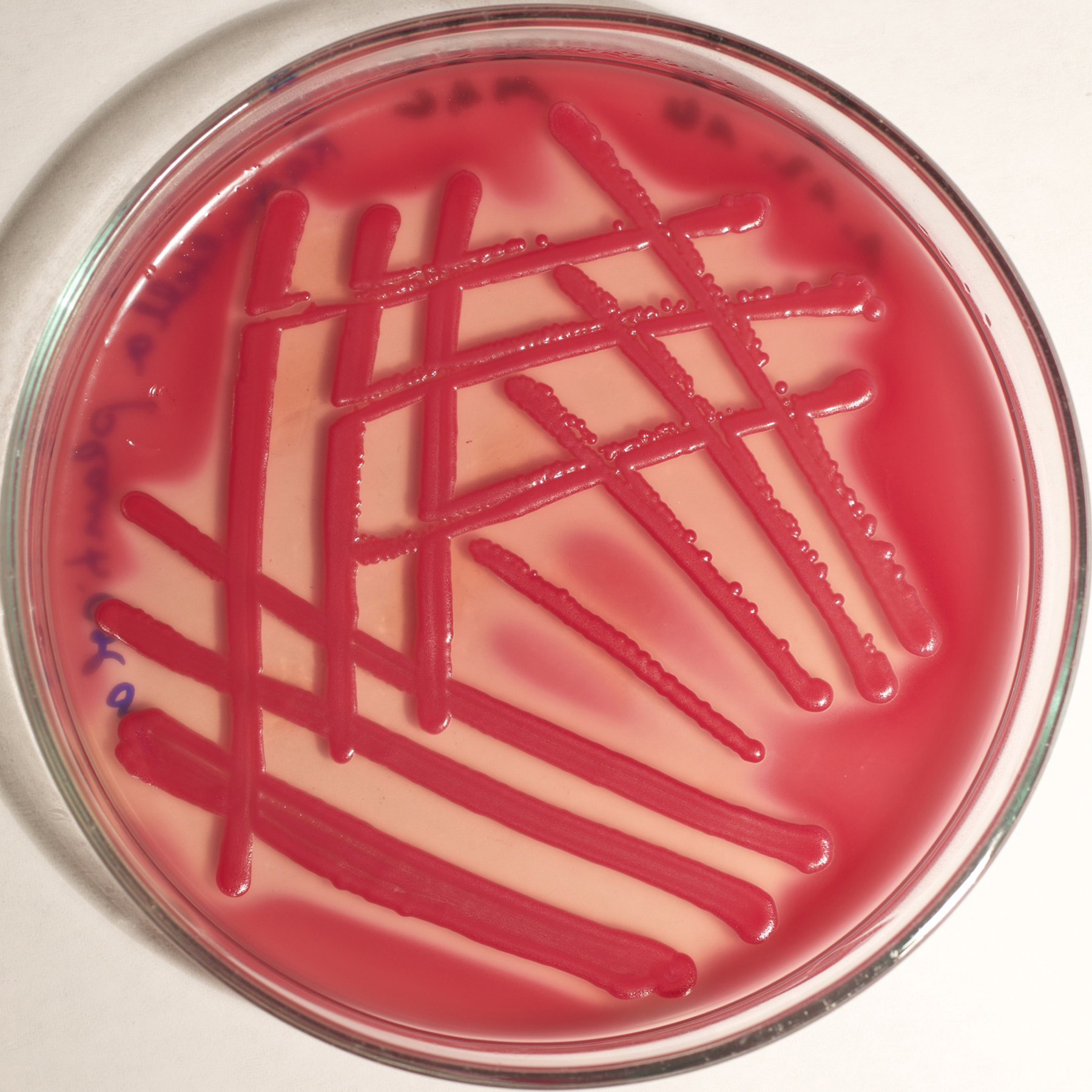
Raoultella planticola on MacConkey agar, showing a positive result (the microorganism has the ability to degrade lactose, which is detected by the pH indicator neutral red). The technique of the streaking is done by using 13 streaks.

Raoultella planticola is a species of Gram-negative bacteria in the genus Raoultella. R. planticola is quite similar in appearance to Klebsiella pneumoniae and must be identified based on growth habits or DNA analysis. A number of strains have been identified.

== Human infection ==
Infections are rare, and mostly seen in immunocompromised patients. R. planticola has been determined to have complicated at least one case of severe pancreatitis.

== Strains ==
A strain of Raoultella planticola, Cd-1 has been found which grows anaerobically at high aqueous cadmium concentrations and precipitates insoluble cadmium sulfide. This strain has been isolated from reducing salt marsh sediments and may be useful in bioremediation of cadmium from exposed soils.

== Taxonomic reclassification ==
Raoultella planticola was formerly classified as part of the genus Klebsiella. It was reclassified along with several other Klebsiella species in 2001.

== Genetic modification ==
In the late 1980s R. planticola was genetically modified by inserting a plasmid from Zymomonas mobilis. This plasmid codes for the enzyme pyruvate decarboxylase which, along with alcohol dehydrogenase already present in the bacteria allow it to produce ethanol. The bacteria already does produce ethanol when metabolizing hexoses and pentoses, but very inefficiently. R. planticola was chosen to receive this gene as it already had metabolic pathways to breakdown pentose sugars such as xylose, which is a main component of agricultural and forest residues. The results showed that the genetically modified strain could produce ethanol but were killed at concentrations of ethanol greater than 5%. The modified strain also produced more ethanol at lower pH (5.4) and ethanol production decreased as pH increased.

In the early 1990s, a biotech company set out to solve a problem: how to destroy crop residue safely. Some crops' residues harbor plant pathogens. Burning is occasionally used to destroy the residue and pathogens, but this is a fire hazard and can be dangerous for the environment. This company realized that, because R. planticola is an aggressive and abundant soil bacterium, it could be genetically modified to destroy crop residue and also create ethanol.

Testing of this process was originally limited to sterile soil. Ph.D. research conducted at Oregon State University, supervised by Elaine Ingham, obtained a sample of the genetically modified organism for assessing ecological effects through the German Institut für Biotechnologie and, testing it in non-sterile (ordinary) soil, found that the modified bacteria caused small amounts of alcohol in the soil. While this level is several hundred times lower than required to affect plant growth, this fact combined with the fact that R. planticola is already found growing in the root systems of all kinds of plants everywhere, sparked a doomsday myth.

== Fallacy of GMO claims ==
Dr Ingham claimed to a New Zealand Commission that "the likely effect of allowing the field trial [with the genetically modified bacteria in question] would have been to destroy terrestrial plants". Ingham's suggestion of a possibility of "worldwide plant death" attracted attention from the scientific community. However, they were unable to find any evidence that these claims had been submitted to scientific publication in a peer-reviewed journal, and no evidence was found to indicate the U.S. EPA or U.S. Dept. of Agriculture had reviewed or approved any trials for SDF20. Additionally, the SDF20 was found to have produced 20 micrograms per milliliter of alcohol in the soil which is several hundred times lower than that required to affect plant growth.

Elaine Ingham has issued a public apology for submitting false claims about ecological impact of GMOs.

The Green Party of New Zealand has issued a public apology for misleading statements and acknowledging that a cited research was never published.

In the episode "The Pyramid at the End of the World" of the BBC television show Doctor Who, the Doctor stops a genetically modified strain of R. planticola from causing a worldwide plant and animal die-off similar to the scenario that some scientists have speculated about.
