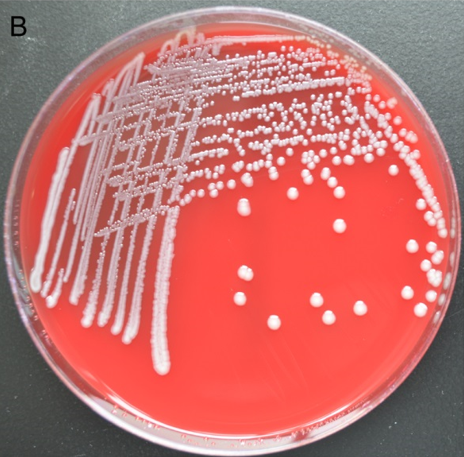
- Raoultella terrigena colonies after a 48-hour culture on sheep blood agar under aerobic conditions.

Scientific classification
- Domain: Bacteria
- Kingdom: Pseudomonadati
- Phylum: Pseudomonadota
- Class: Gammaproteobacteria
- Order: Enterobacterales
- Family: Enterobacteriaceae
- Genus: Raoultella
- Species: R. terrigena

Binomial name
- Raoultella terrigena (Izard et al. 1981) Drancourt et al. 2001

= Raoultella terrigena =

Species of bacteria

Raoultella terrigena is a Gram-negative bacterial species of the genus Raoultella, previously classified in the genus Klebsiella. It has primarily been isolated from soil and water samples, but rarely from humans. Studies have estimated fewer than 1% of healthy people harbor this species. This species has rarely been shown to cause disease in humans despite expressing many of the virulence factors expressed by other Klebsiella species such as Klebsiella pneumoniae.

Phylogenic comparisons between the 16s rRNA and rpoB genes of this and other Klebsiella species have suggested classification into a newer genus, Raoultella, a reclassification that has been adopted.

R. terrigena is considered a factor in melamine toxicity. In culture, R. terrigena was shown to convert melamine to cyanuric acid directly. Rats colonized by R. terrigena showed greater melamine-induced kidney damage compared to those not colonized.
