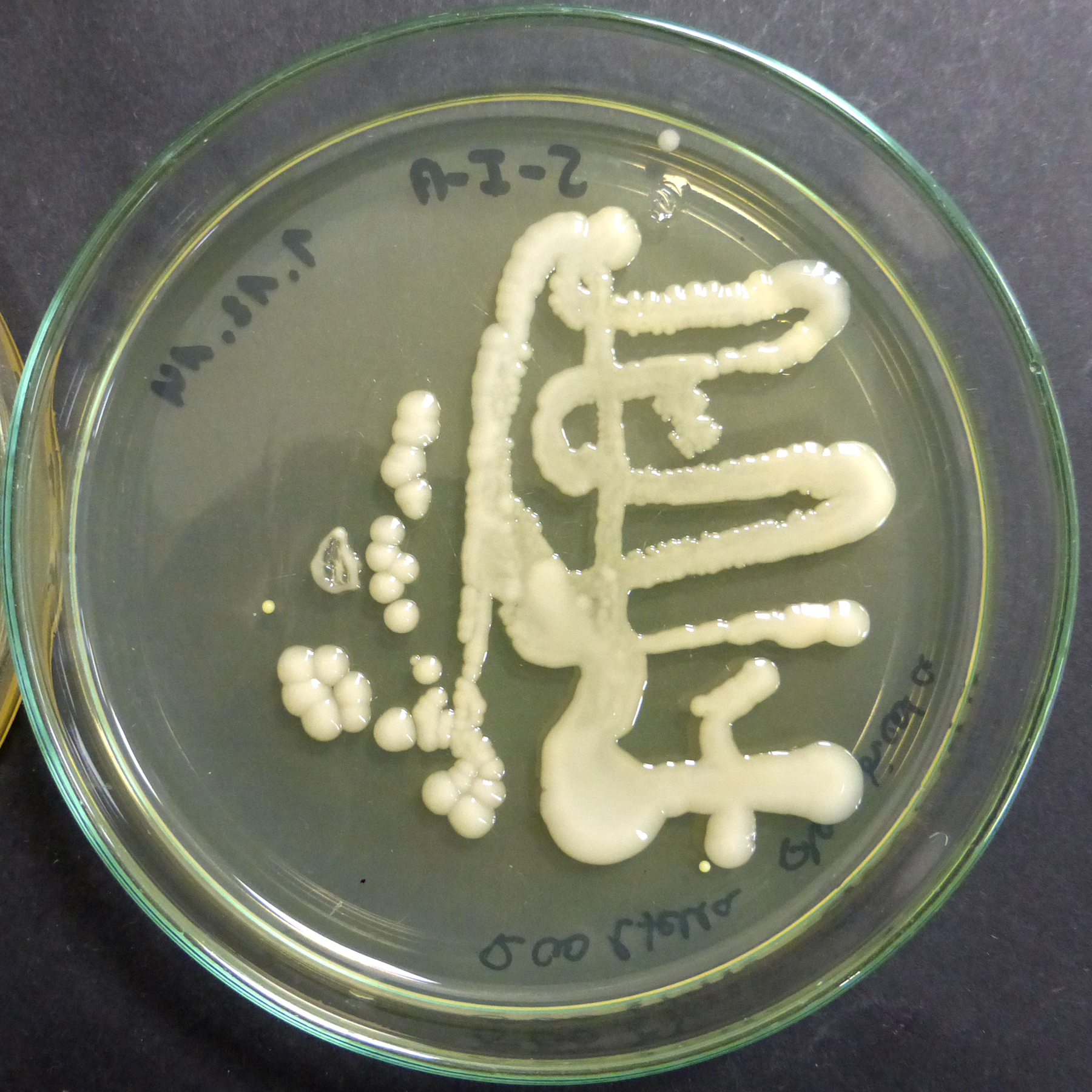
- Raoultella planticola

Scientific classification
- Domain: Bacteria
- Kingdom: Pseudomonadati
- Phylum: Pseudomonadota
- Class: Gammaproteobacteria
- Order: Enterobacterales
- Family: Enterobacteriaceae
- Genus: Raoultella; Drancourt et al., 2001

Species
- Raoultella electrica Raoultella ornithinolytica Raoultella planticola Raoultella terrigena

= Raoultella =

Genus of bacteria

The genus Raoultella is composed of Gram-negative, oxidase-negative, aerobic, nonmotile, capsulated, facultatively anaerobic rods (formerly designated Klebsiella) in the family Enterobacteriaceae. It is named after the French bacteriologist Didier Raoult. Further research has suggested that the members of the genus Raoultella should be placed back into Klebsiella.

== Description ==
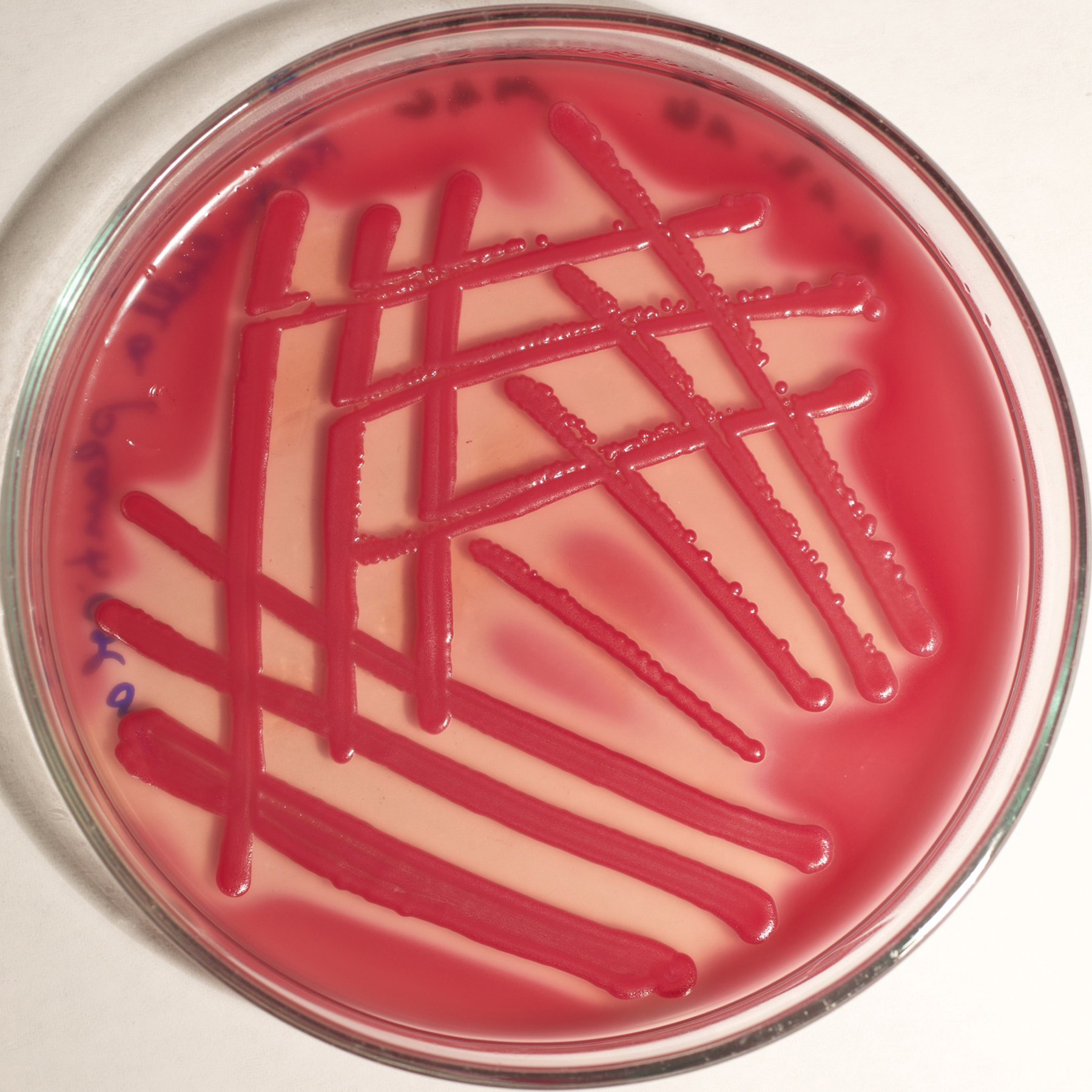
Raoultella planticola on MacConkey agar, showing a positive result (the microorganism has the ability to degrade lactose, which is detected by the pH indicator neutral red). The technique of the streaking is done by using 13 streaks.

Members of genus Raoultella grow at 10 °C consistent with their recovery from plants, soil, and water, whereas members of Klebsiella do not grow at 10 °C and are mainly recovered from mammals' mucosae. Klebsiella oxytoca is an exception, and a proposal to classify K. oxytoca in a separate, unnamed genus has been made.

It consists of species Raoultella electrica, Raoultella ornithinolytica, Raoultella planticola and Raoultella terrigena.

In human infections, Raoultella species are generally sensitive to treatment with carbapenems. In one series, 92% were sensitive to ciprofloxacin. More than 10% produced extended-spectrum beta-lactamases.

== Species ==
Type species for this genus are:

- Raoultella electrica 1GB^{T}
- Raoultella ornithinolytica ATCC 31898^{T}
- Raoultella planticola ATCC 33531^{T}
- Raoultella terrigena ATCC 33257^{T}

== Synonym ==
A phylogenetic tree of Klebsiella, based on a 2.93-Mbp alignment, unambiguously places R. ornithinolytica sister to K. oxytoca within the larger Klebsiella phylogeny and suggests abandoning the genus Raoultella designation.

Robust phylogenetic analyses have repeatedly shown that species classified into this genus are nested in the genus Klebsiella, indicating Raoultella should be abandoned and considered a junior synonym of Klebsiella.

In November 2021, the synonym Klebsiella electrica is reported "not validly published". The correct name with a valid nomenclatural status is Raoultella electrica.
