= David W. Deamer =

American cell biologist

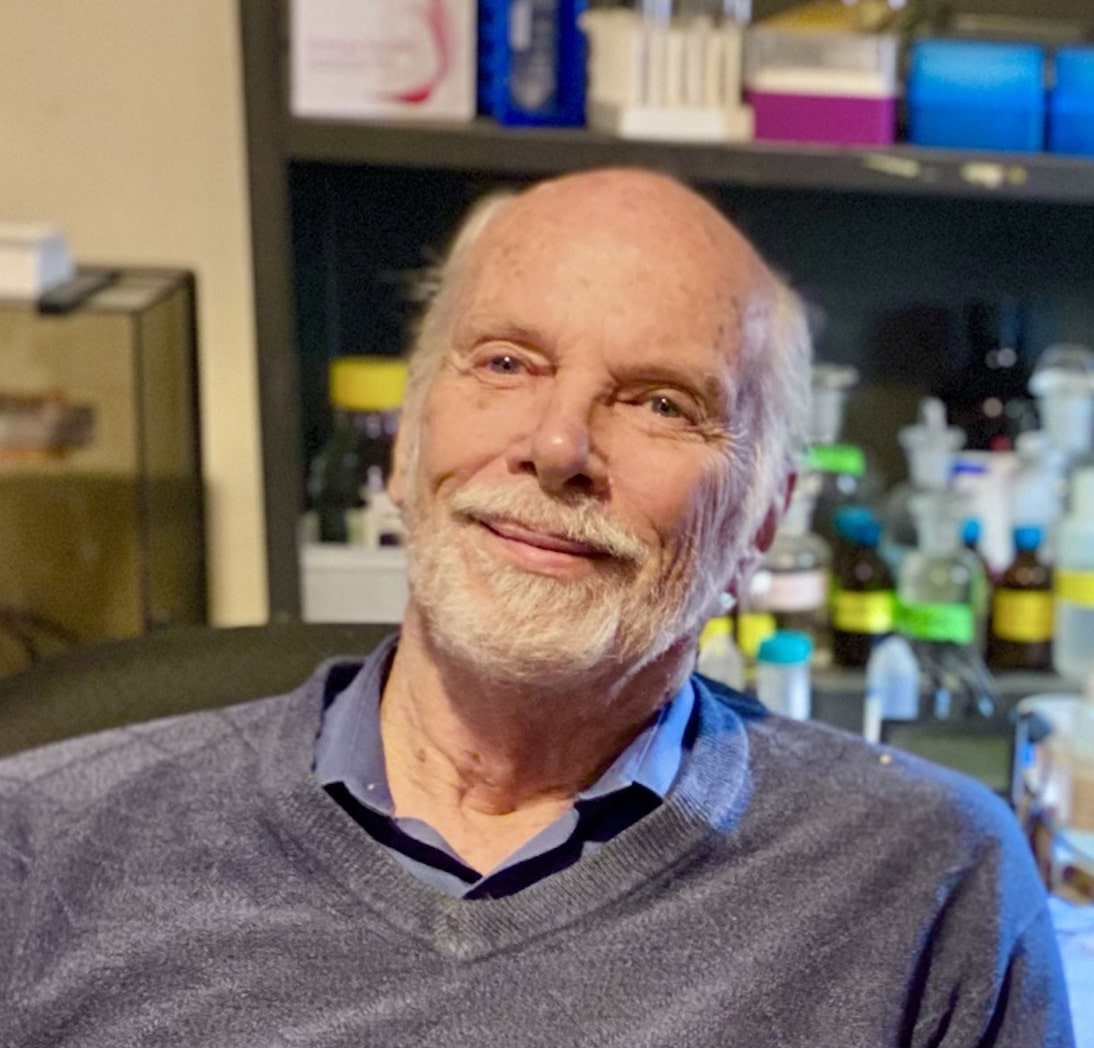
- Deamer in his Lab
- Born: April 21, 1939 (age 87); Santa Monica, CA
- Occupation: Biologist
- Awards: Guggenheim Fellow, 1985

Academic background
- Education: Duke University (B.Sc. 1961); Ohio State University (Ph.D. 1965)
- Alma mater: Ohio State University
- Thesis: The effect of alkaline earth ions on fatty acid and phospholipid monolayers (1965)
- Doctoral advisor: David Cornwell

Academic work
- Discipline: Biophysicist
- Institutions: University of California, Santa Cruz
- Notable ideas: nanopore sequencing

David Wilson Deamer (born April 21, 1939) is an American biologist and research professor of Biomolecular Engineering at the University of California, Santa Cruz. Deamer has made contributions to the field of membrane biophysics. His work led to a novel method of DNA sequencing and a more complete understanding of the role of membranes in the origin of life.

He was awarded a Guggenheim Fellowship in 1985, which supported research at the Australian National University in Canberra to investigate organic compounds in the Murchison meteorite. He served as the president of the International Society for the Study of the Origin of Life from 2013 to 2014.

== Early life ==
Deamer's father, also David, worked at Douglas Aircraft in Santa Monica, California, during and after World War II while his mother Zena cared for Deamer and his two brothers, Richard and John. In 1952, the family moved to Ohio, where the three brothers attended Westerville High School. In 1957, Deamer submitted his research on self-organizing protozoa to the Westinghouse Science Talent Search and was among the 40 winners who were invited to Washington DC that year. He was awarded a full scholarship to Duke University, where he completed a bachelor's degree in chemistry in 1961.

Deamer earned a Ph.D. in Physiological Chemistry at the Ohio State University College of Medicine in 1965 and was a postdoctoral fellow at the University of California, Berkeley from 1965 to 1967.

== Academic career ==
He began his academic career at the University of California, Davis, serving as a professor from 1967 to 1994. In 1994, he joined the University of California, Santa Cruz, where he became a research professor in Chemistry and Biochemistry. He later co- founded the Department of Biomolecular Engineering and served as its chair from 2003 to 2006. Deamer has held visiting scientist positions at the University of Bristol, the Weizmann Institute, and the Australian National University.

== Research ==
As a young professor at UC Davis, Deamer continued to work with electron microscopy, revealing for the first time particles related to functional ATPase enzymes within the membranes of sarcoplasmic reticulum. After spending sabbaticals in England at the University of Bristol in 1971 and with Alec Bangham in 1975, Deamer became interested in liposomes. Conversations with Bangham inspired his research on the role of membranes in the origin of life, and in 1985 Deamer demonstrated that the Murchison carbonaceous meteorite contained lipid-like compounds that could assemble into membranous vesicles. Deamer described the significance of self-assembly processes in his 2011 book First Life. In collaborative work with Mark Akeson, a post-doctoral student at the time, the two established methods for monitoring proton permeation through ion channels such as gramicidin. In 1989, while returning from a scientific meeting in Oregon, Deamer conceived that it might be possible to sequence single molecules of DNA by using an imposed voltage to pull them individually through a nanoscopic channel. The DNA sequence could be distinguished by the specific modulating effect of the four bases on the ionic current through the channel.

=== Nanopore Sequencing ===
In 1993, he and Dan Branton initiated a research collaboration with John Kasianowitz at NIST to explore this possibility with the hemolysin channel, and in 1996 published the first paper demonstrating that nanopore sequencing may be feasible. George Church at Harvard had independently proposed a similar idea, and Church, Branton and Deamer decided to initiate a patent application which was awarded in 1998. Mark Akeson joined the research effort in 1997, and in 1999 published a paper showing that the hemolysin channel, now referred to as a nanopore, could distinguish between purine and pyrimidine bases in single RNA molecules. In 2007, Oxford Nanopore Technologies (ONT) licensed the patents describing the technology and in 2014 released the MinION nanopore sequencing device to selected researchers. The first publications appeared in 2015, one of which used the MinION to sequence E. coli DNA with 99.4% accuracy relative to the established 5.4 million base pair genome. Despite earlier skepticism, nanopore sequencing is now accepted as a viable third generation sequencing method.

=== Origin of Life ===
Another major area of Deamer's research is the origin and evolution of cellular membranes. He demonstrated that amphiphilic molecules found in meteorites can self-assemble into membrane- like structures, offering insights into the potential precursors to life on Earth. His experiments with hydration-dehydration cycles revealed pathways for the encapsulation of polymers in primitive vesicles, providing a possible mechanism for the emergence of protocells.

== Selected publications ==
- First Life: Discovering the Connections between Stars, Cells, and How Life Began. Berkeley: University of California Press. 2011. ISBN 978-0-520-94895-2. JSTOR 10.1525/j.ctt1pnnb2. OCLC 727950391.
- Assembling Life: How Can Life Begin on Earth and Other Habitable Planets?. New York: Oxford University Press. 2020 [2018]. ISBN 978-0-19-755974-1. OCLC 1222774776.
- Origin of Life: What Everyone Needs to Know. New York, NY: Oxford University Press. 2020. ISBN 978-0-19-009901-5. OCLC 1140352767.
- Kaufman, Wallace; Deamer, David W. (2016). The Hunt for FOXP5. Cham: Springer International Publishing. doi:10.1007/978-3-319-28961-8. ISBN 978-3-319-28960-1. OCLC 949355443.
