= Hagan Bayley =

British biochemist

- Born: John Hagan Pryce Bayley; 13 February 1951 (age 75); Wales, UK
- Education: Balliol College, Oxford (BA); Harvard University (PhD)
- Known for: Nanopore sequencing; Nanoreactors
- Awards: FRS (2011)
- Scientific career
- Fields: Chemical Biology
- Workplaces: University of Oxford; MIT; Columbia University; Texas A&M University
- Thesis: Adamantylidene: A Hydrophobic, Photogenerated Reagent for the Characterization of Intrinsic Membrane Proteins (1979)
- Doctoral advisor: Jeremy Knowles
- Website: bayley.chem.ox.ac.uk

John Hagan Pryce Bayley FRS, FLSW (born 13 February 1951) is a British scientist, who holds the position of Professor of Chemical Biology at the University of Oxford.

== Life and education ==
Bayley was educated at The King's School, Chester and Uppingham School, before going to Balliol College, Oxford in 1970 and Harvard University Graduate School of Arts and Sciences, where he was awarded a Ph.D. in 1979.

Originally from Wales, he spent much of his early career between the United Kingdom and the United States.

== Research ==
Bayley's research is largely based on the study and engineering of transmembrane pore-forming proteins, as well as interests in chemical signal transduction and biomolecular materials. He is the co-founder of Oxford Nanopore Technologies Ltd. Bayley's research includes work on the pore-forming protein alpha haemolysin engineered for sensing has been highly cited.

== Career ==
Following his PhD, Bayley completed postdoctoral research at Massachusetts Institute of Technology. He previously held appointments at Columbia University, University of Massachusetts Medical School, and Texas A&M University. Bayley has been based at the University of Oxford since 2003 and is a fellow of Hertford College, Oxford.

== Awards and honours ==
Bayley was elected a Fellow of the Royal Society in 2011. His nomination reads

Hagan Bayley's achievements lie at the interface between chemistry and biology. He has used protein chemistry, organic chemistry, and biophysics to explore the folding, assembly, and function of transmembrane channels and pores. These studies have led to the development of protein pores as "nanoreactors", with which both non-covalent and covalent chemistry of single molecules can be examined. Applications of this methodology have included host–guest interactions and step-by-step polymer growth. Based on this work, Bayley has developed "stochastic sensing," which has been shown with a wide variety of analytes to reveal both concentration and identity through single-molecule detection.

In 2012, Bayley was elected as a Fellow of the Learned Society of Wales.

The Science Council recognised him as "one of the UK's 100 leading practising scientists" of 2014.
