= Klebsiella variicola =

Scientific classification
- Domain: Bacteria
- Kingdom: Pseudomonadati
- Phylum: Pseudomonadota
- Class: Gammaproteobacteria
- Order: Enterobacterales
- Family: Enterobacteriaceae
- Genus: Klebsiella
- Species: K. variicola

Binomial name
- Klebsiella variicola Rosenblueth et al. 2004

Species of bacterium

Klebsiella variicola is a species of bacteria which was originally identified as a benign endosymbiont in plants, but has since been associated with disease in humans and cattle as well.

== Description ==
Klebsiella variicola was described as a species of Klebsiella distinct from its closely related species Klebsiella pneumoniae in 2004. Like other Klebsiella species, K. variicola is Gram-negative, rod-shaped, non-motile, and covered by a polysaccharide capsule.

== Clinical significance ==
Klebsiella variicola is an opportunistic human pathogen and a member of the Klebsiella pneumoniae species complex. Its clinical prevalence has historically been underestimated because of its close phenotypic and biochemical similarity to K. pneumoniae, which can result in misidentification by some microbiological identification systems. Accurate identification can be achieved using molecular or genome-based methods, while MALDI-TOF mass spectrometry can distinguish K. variicola from K. pneumoniae when appropriate reference spectra are included in the identification database.

The species has been associated with bloodstream infection and healthcare-associated outbreaks, including outbreaks in neonatal intensive care units. In 2024, whole-genome sequencing identified an outbreak of K. variicola sequence type 6385 in a neonatal intensive care unit in New Zealand involving four infants, two of whom had bacteraemia. The outbreak strain was also recovered from two sink traps in the unit, and genomic analysis supported transmission between the outbreak-associated isolates.

== Hosts ==
Klebsiella variicola is known to associate with a number of different plants including banana trees, sugarcane and has been isolated from the fungal gardens of leaf-cutter ants. Some K. variicola strains have been associated with disease in humans, suggesting they may be able to serve as opportunistic pathogens of humans. K. variicola have also been isolated from cows suffering from bovine mastitis.
