= Elaine Ingham =

American microbiologist and soil researcher (1952–2026)

Elaine Ruth Ingham (née Stowe; June 26, 1952 – February 16, 2026) was an American microbiologist and soil biology researcher and founder of Soil Foodweb Inc. and the Soil Foodweb School. She was known as a leader in soil microbiology and research of the soil food web. She was an author of the USDA's Soil Biology Primer and was influential in the regenerative agriculture movement.

== Education and career ==
Ingham earned a bachelor’s degree in biology and chemistry in 1974 from St. Olaf College in Northfield, Minnesota, and a master's in microbiology in 1977 from Texas A&M University. In 1981, Ingham earned a PhD from the Colorado State University in microbiology with an emphasis in soil. Along with her husband Russ, who has a doctorate in zoology emphasizing nematology, she was offered a post-doctoral fellowship at the Natural Resource Ecology Lab at Colorado State University. In 1985, she accepted a Research Associate Fellowship at the University of Georgia.

In 1986, Ingham moved to Oregon State University and joined the faculty in both Forest Science and Botany and Plant Pathology. She remained on faculty until 2001.

Ingham was an Affiliate Professor of Sustainable Living at Maharishi University of Management in Fairfield, Iowa, Adjunct Faculty at Southern Cross University in Lismore, New South Wales, Australia, from 1999 to 2005, Visiting Professor with Melbourne University from 2004 to 2008, and was Program Chair of the Ecological Society of America from 1999 to 2000. She was named chief scientist at The Rodale Institute in 2011 and was later director of research and an instructor at the Environment Celebration Institute's farm in California.

She was the founder of Soil Foodweb Inc, which works with soil testing laboratories to assess soil biology. In October 2025, the Soil Foodweb School announced Ingham's retirement.

== Personal life and death ==
Ingham was born Elaine Ruth Stowe in St. Paul, Minnesota, on June 26, 1952. Her father was chairman of the veterinary science department at the University of Minnesota. She married Russell Ingham in 1975. Elaine Ingham died in Fort Mill, South Carolina, on February 16, 2026, at the age of 73.

== Selected publications ==
- Ingham, E.R. and M. Alms. (1999), The Compost Tea Handbook 1.1
- Ingham, E.R. (2000) The Compost Tea Brewing Manual. Sustainable Studies Institute, Eugene, Oregon. 2nd–5th eds. Soil Foodweb Inc, Corvallis, Oregon.
- Ingham, E. R. (1999). Chapters 1–5 in: The Soil Biology Primer. NRCS Soil Quality Institute, USDA.
- Ingham, E.R. (2004). "The Soil Foodweb: Its Role in Ecosystems Health". In: The Overstory Book: Cultivating Connections with Trees. Ed. Craig R. Elevitch. 2nd ed. Holualoa, Hawaii: Permanent Agriculture Resources.
- Ingham, E.R. and M.D. Slaughter. (2005). "The Soil Foodweb–Soil and Composts As Living Ecosystems". International SoilACE Conference in Soil and Compost Eco-Biology. Leon, Spain. 1: 127-139.
- Ingham, R.E. and Trofymow, J.A. and Ingham, E.R. and Coleman, D.C. (1985), "Interactions of bacteria, fungi, and their nematode grazers: effects on nutrient cycling and plant growth", Ecological monographs 55 (1), 119-140.

== See also ==
- Klebsiella planticola
