= Oxford Nanopore Technologies =

U.K.-based nanopore sequencing company

Oxford Nanopore Technologies plc
- Type: Public limited company
- Traded as: LSE: ONT; FTSE 250 component
- ISIN: GB00BP6S8Z30
- Industry: Nanopore sequencing
- Founded: 2005; 21 years ago
- Founders: Hagan Bayley; Gordon Sanghera; Spike Willcocks
- Headquarters: Oxford Science Park, Oxford, United Kingdom
- Key people: Duncan Tatton-Brown (Chair); Francis Van Parys (CEO)
- Revenue: ▲£223.9 million (2025)
- Operating income: ▼£(155.3) million (2025)
- Net income: ▲£(145.2) million (2025)
- Website: nanoporetech.com

Oxford Nanopore Technologies plc is a UK-based company which develops and sells nanopore-based molecular sensing technology for the real-time analysis of DNA and RNA. Its platform includes sequencing devices, consumables and software used across research, applied and clinical markets. It is listed on the London Stock Exchange and is a constituent of the FTSE 250 Index.

== History ==
The company was founded in 2005 as a spin-out from the University of Oxford by Hagan Bayley, Gordon Sanghera, and Spike Willcocks, with seed funding from the IP Group. The company made an initial public offering on the London Stock Exchange on 30 September 2021, under the ticker ONT.

In March 2016 the company announced a chemistry upgrade to its nanopore sequencing product 'R9', using a protein nanopore in collaboration with the laboratory of Han Remaut (VIB/Vrije Universiteit Brussel). The company stated in a webcast that R9 is designed to improve error rates and yield.

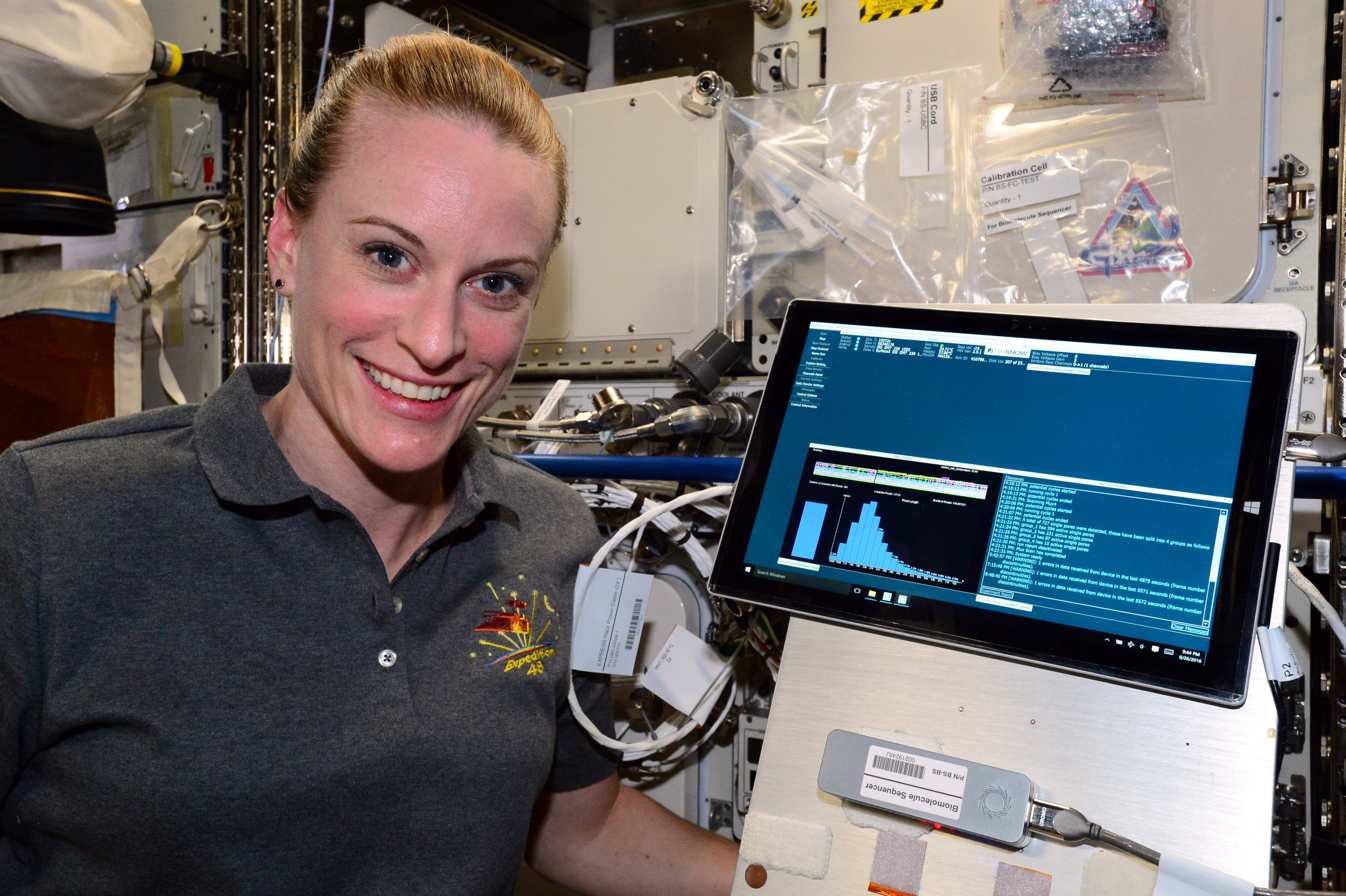
NASA astronaut Kate Rubins with a MinION sequencer on the ISS in August 2016.

In December 2025, the company announced that Francis Van Parys would succeed Gordon Sanghera as CEO. Prior to joining Oxford Nanopore, he was President and CEO of Radiometer and held senior leadership roles at Cytiva and GE Healthcare.

== Products ==
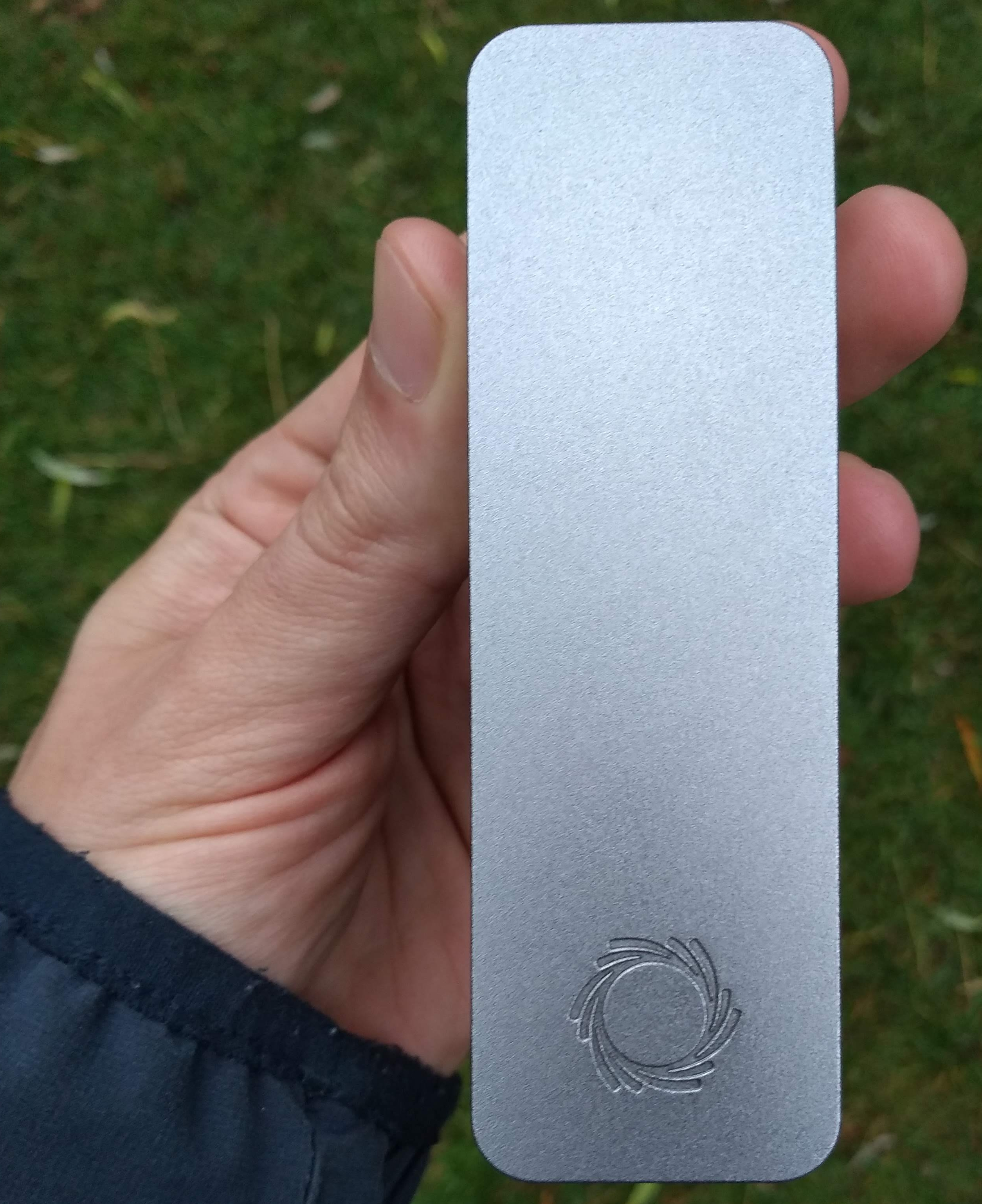
Top view of a closed Oxford Nanopore Technologies MinION sequencer showing how it is small enough to be held in one hand

The main products of Oxford Nanopore are:

- MinION: this harmonica-sized portable protein nanopore sequencing USB device has been commercially available since May 2015.
- GridION: this desktop device has been commercially available since March 2017. The device processes up to five MinION flow cells and enables generation of up to 100 Gb of data per run.
- PromethION: a desktop device for sequencing of native DNA or RNA samples. The device contains channels for 144,000 nanopores (in comparison to MinION’s 512) and delivers up to 290 Gb of data per flow cell.
- PromethION 24: this device is a nanopore sequencing platform released in 2019 for DNA and RNA sequencing projects. It 24 flow cells which can be run independently.
- EPI2ME: a procut for customers with limited computational experience to process data without high-performance computing resources and programming expertise.

These products are intended to be used for the analysis of DNA, RNA, proteins and small molecules with a range of applications in personalized medicine, Agricultural science and scientific research.
