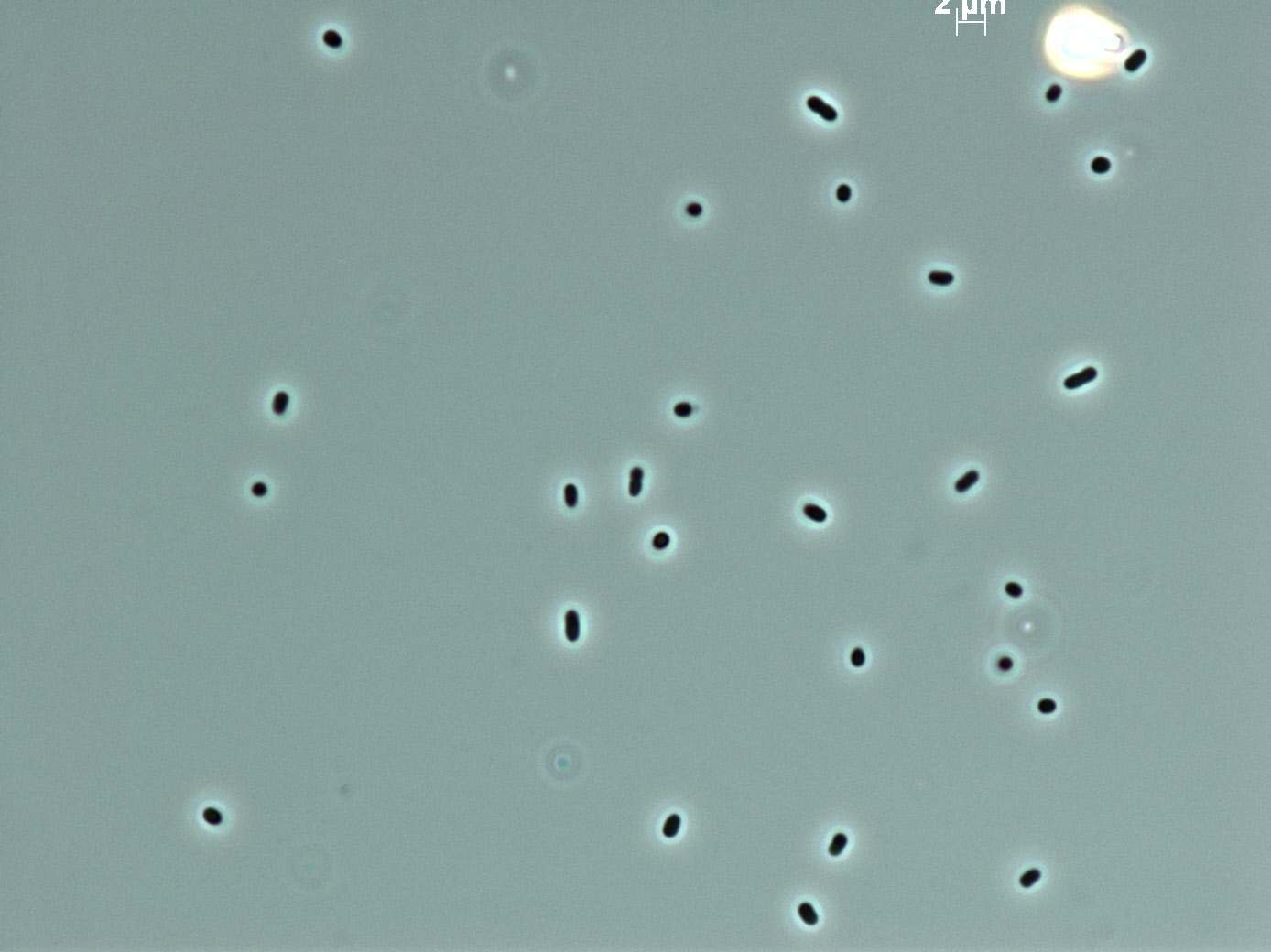
- Microscope view of Klebsiella Michiganesis

Scientific classification
- Domain: Bacteria
- Kingdom: Pseudomonadati
- Phylum: Pseudomonadota
- Class: Gammaproteobacteria
- Order: Enterobacterales
- Family: Enterobacteriaceae
- Genus: Klebsiella
- Species: K. michiganensis

Binomial name
- Klebsiella michiganensis Saha et al., 2013

= Klebsiella michiganensis =

Species of bacteria

Klebsiella michiganensis is a species of bacteria in the genus Klebsiella and is one of the nine species in the Klebsiella oxytoca complex. It is closely related to the species K. oxytoca except K. michiganensis is negative in the pectin degradation test and negative by PCR for polygalacturonase gene pehX. The name K. michiganensis comes from the United States' state of Michigan, where the species was originally isolated from a toothbrush holder. The designated type strain ‘W14’ has been deposited in multiple international culture collections, making it widely accessible for research. It is capable of biofilm formation and has been increasingly studied for its genomic characteristics, ecological roles, and emerging relevance as a potential opportunistic pathogen.
