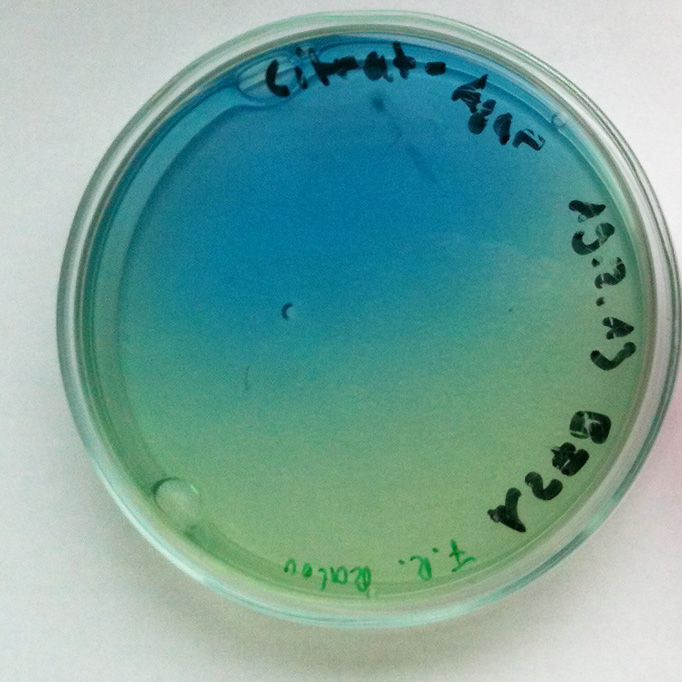
- Species R. planticola from the same genus

Scientific classification
- Domain: Bacteria
- Kingdom: Pseudomonadati
- Phylum: Pseudomonadota
- Class: Gammaproteobacteria
- Order: Enterobacterales
- Family: Pectobacteriaceae
- Genus: Klebsiella
- Species: K. electrica

Binomial name
- Klebsiella electrica (Kimura et al. 2014) Ma et al. 2022

Synonyms
- Raoultella electrica Kimura et al. 2014

= Klebsiella electrica =

Species of bacterium

Klebsiella electrica is a Gram-negative, non-spore-forming, rod-shaped bacterium of the genus Klebsiella. It was formerly known as Raoultella electrica before being reclassified in 2022 based on phylogenomic evidence. The type strain of K. electrica was isolated from anodic biofilms of a microbial fuel cell fed with glucose.

== Type strain ==
The type strain of Klebsiella electrica, 1GB, is a facultative anaerobic and chemo-organotrophic bacterium capable of both respiratory and fermentative metabolism. It can utilize a wide variety of sugars as carbon and energy sources.

== Description ==
K. electrica cells are Gram-negative, non-spore-forming, rod-shaped, facultative anaerobic, and non-motile. Their width is approximately 0.3–0.4 μm, and their length ranges from 3.0 to 6.0 μm. They grow optimally at 37 °C and are also capable of growth at 41 °C. Unlike Klebsiella pneumoniae, K. electrica strains can grow at 10 °C but not at 5 °C. These bacteria are Voges–Proskauer positive. Their ability to produce histamine has not been confirmed.

== Taxonomy ==
Klebsiella electrica was originally described as Raoultella electrica in 2014. In 2021, a phylogenomic study by Ma et al. demonstrated that species of the genus Raoultella were nested within the genus Klebsiella, sharing a monophyletic lineage, high average amino acid identity (AAI), and conserved signature indels. Based on this evidence, the authors proposed the reunification of the two genera. The corrigendum in 2022 formalized the taxonomic reclassification of R. electrica as Klebsiella electrica comb. nov.

The species epithet electrica (from Latin electrum, "amber") refers to the electricity-generating microbial environment from which it was isolated—anodic biofilms of a microbial fuel cell in Sapporo, Japan.

== Pathogenicity ==
The pathogenic potential of K. electrica is currently unknown. However, the bacterium was isolated from chicken eggs in Jaipur, India, displaying a multidrug resistance profile.
