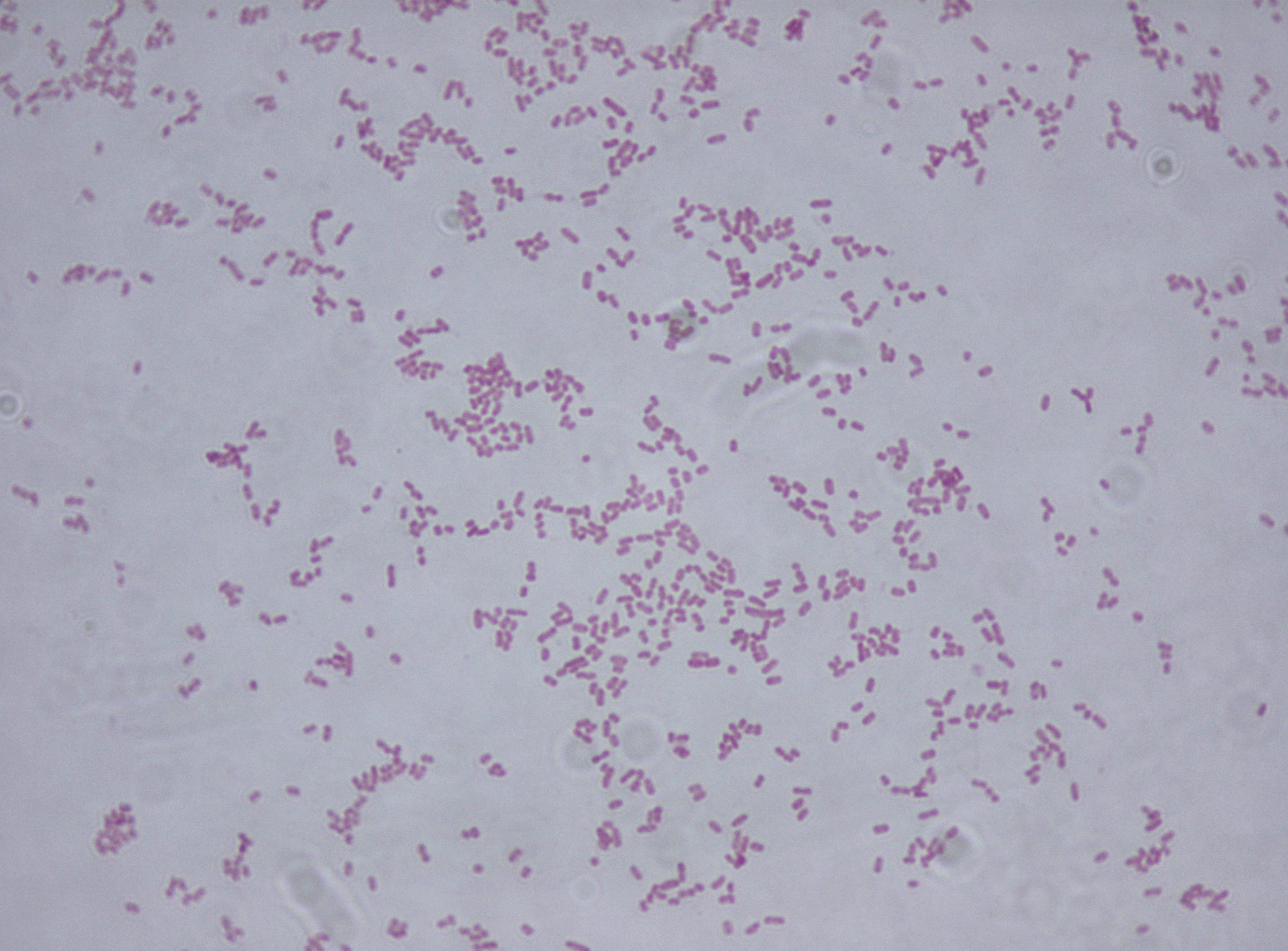
- Gram stain

Scientific classification
- Domain: Bacteria
- Kingdom: Pseudomonadati
- Phylum: Pseudomonadota
- Class: Gammaproteobacteria
- Order: Enterobacterales
- Family: Enterobacteriaceae
- Genus: Klebsiella
- Species: K. oxytoca

Binomial name
- Klebsiella oxytoca (Flügge 1886) Lautrop 1956

= Klebsiella oxytoca =

Species of bacterium

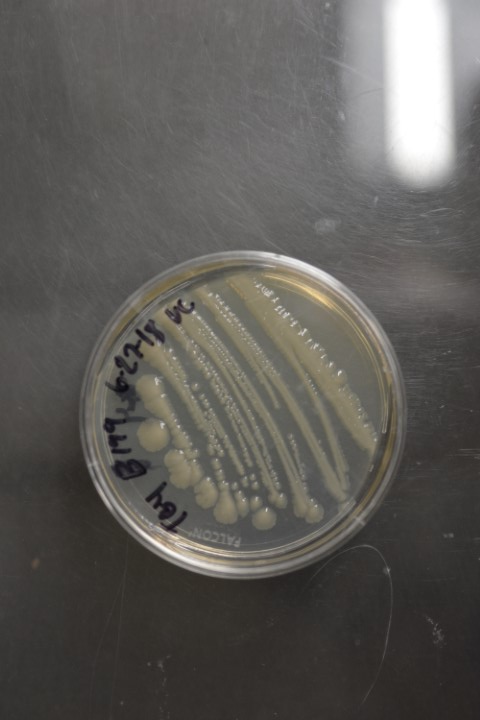
Klebsiella oxytoca on agar plate

Klebsiella oxytoca is a Gram-negative, rod-shaped bacterium that is closely related to K. pneumoniae, from which it is distinguished through its production of indole. This species was first described in 1886 when it was isolated from sour milk and named Bacillus oxytocus perniciosus (from Greek oxus 'sour' + -tokos 'producing').

== Characteristics ==
K. oxytoca also has slightly different growth characteristics in that it is able to grow on melezitose, but not 3-hydroxybutyrate.

Klebsiella oxytoca is characterized by negative methyl red, positive VP, positive citrate, urea and TSI gas production, is AA, and negative for TSI sulfide, DNAse, growth on sulfide-indole motility medium and the phenylalanine deaminase test.

It is a diazotroph, able to colonise plant hosts and fix atmospheric nitrogen into a form which the plant can use. Association of K. oxytoca with the barley rhizosphere during an entire vegetative period has been demonstrated. The bacteria adhere strongly to root hairs, and less strongly to the surface of the zone of elongation and root cap mucilage.

Like other enterobacteria, it is capable of acquiring antibiotic resistance, and isolates have been shown to produce extended-spectrum beta-lactamases as well as carbapenemases.

== Industrial uses ==
Klebsiella oxytoca has shown promise in industrial ethanol fuel production, and is referenced as being used to produce hydrogen in patents filed by Nanologix, Inc.

== Clinical significance and epidemiology ==
K. oxytoca is a normal inhabitant of the gastrointestinal tract. Infections can result in colitis and sepsis.

This species is an important cause of hospital-acquired infections. Outbreaks of antibiotic-resistant Klebsiella oxytoca have occurred in multiple hospitals and ICUs throughout the world, and handwashing stations have been identified as a potentially important environmental reservoir.

== Ecology ==
Houseflies (Musca domestica) have a mutualistic relationship with the bacterium K. oxytoca. This bacterium can live on the surface of the housefly eggs and has a deterrent effect on the fungi growing in manure, thus benefiting the fly larvae which are competing with the fungi for nutrients.
