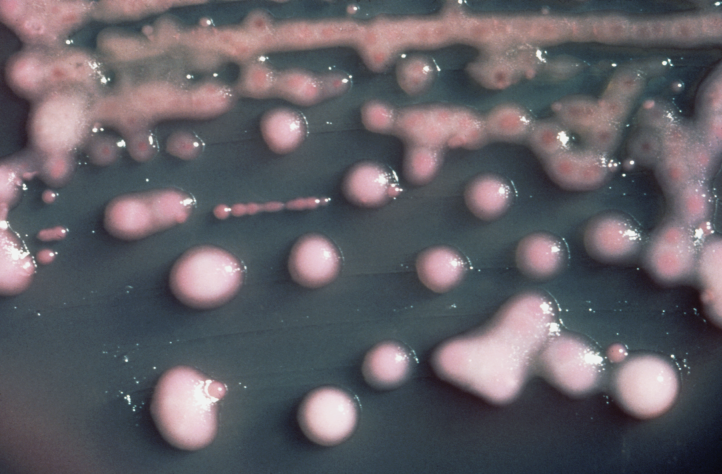
- K. pneumoniae on a MacConkey agar plate

Scientific classification
- Domain: Bacteria
- Kingdom: Pseudomonadati
- Phylum: Pseudomonadota
- Class: Gammaproteobacteria
- Order: Enterobacterales
- Family: Enterobacteriaceae
- Genus: Klebsiella
- Species: K. pneumoniae

Binomial name
- Klebsiella pneumoniae (Schroeter 1886) Trevisan 1887

Subspecies
- subsp. aerogenes; subsp. ozaenae; subsp. pneumoniae; subsp. rhinoscleromatis

= Klebsiella pneumoniae =

Species of bacterium

Klebsiella pneumoniae is a Gram-negative, non-motile, encapsulated, lactose-fermenting, facultative anaerobic, rod-shaped bacterium. It appears as a mucoid lactose fermenter on MacConkey agar.

Although found in the normal flora of the mouth, skin, and intestines, it can cause destructive changes to human and animal lungs if aspirated, specifically to the alveoli, resulting in bloody, brownish or yellow colored jelly-like sputum. In the clinical setting, it is the most significant member of the genus Klebsiella of the Enterobacteriaceae. K. oxytoca and K. rhinoscleromatis have also been demonstrated in human clinical specimens. In recent years, Klebsiella species have become important pathogens in nosocomial infections.

It naturally occurs in the soil, and about 30% of strains can fix nitrogen in anaerobic conditions. As a free-living diazotroph, its nitrogen-fixation system has been much-studied, and is of agricultural interest, as K. pneumoniae has been demonstrated to increase crop yields in agricultural conditions.

It is closely related to K. oxytoca from which it is distinguished by being indole-negative and by its ability to grow on melezitose but not 3-hydroxybutyrate.

== History ==
The genus Klebsiella was named after the German microbiologist Edwin Klebs (1834–1913). It is also known as Friedlander's bacillum in honor of Carl Friedländer, a German pathologist, who proposed that this bacterium was the etiological factor for the pneumonia seen especially in immunocompromised individuals such as people with chronic diseases or alcoholics.

Community-acquired pneumonia caused by Klebsiella pneumoniae may occasionally be called Friedländer's pneumonia.

== Role in disease ==
=== Klebsiella pneumonia ===
The most common condition caused by Klebsiella bacteria outside the hospital is pneumonia, typically in the form of bronchopneumonia and also bronchitis. These patients have an increased tendency to develop lung abscesses, cavitation, empyema, and pleural adhesions. Antibiotic resistance is highest in Asia. A study done in Turkey in 2016 revealed that bacteremia from Klebsiella has a death rate around 50%, even with antimicrobial therapy.

==== Pathophysiology ====
It is typically due to aspiration and alcoholism may be a risk factor, though it is also commonly implicated in hospital-acquired urinary tract infections, and COPD (chronic obstructive pulmonary disease) individuals. In terms of the pathophysiology of Klebsiella pneumonia the neutrophil myeloperoxidase defense against K. pneumoniae is often seen. Oxidative inactivation of elastase is involved, while LBP helps transfer bacteria cell wall elements to the cells.

==== Signs and symptoms ====
Individuals with Klebsiella pneumoniae tend to cough up a characteristic "currant jelly" sputum, as well as having fever, nausea, tachycardia, and vomiting. Klebsiella pneumoniae tends to affect people with underlying conditions, such as alcoholism.

==== Diagnosis ====
In terms of the diagnosis of Klebsiella pneumoniae the following can be done to determine if the individual has this infection, with the addition of susceptibility testing to identify drug-resistant organisms:

- Blood culture
- CBC
- Sputum (culture)
- Radiography (chest)
- CT scan

==== Treatment ====
Treatment for Klebsiella pneumoniae is by antibiotics such as aminoglycosides, piperacillin/tazobactam, and cephalosporins, the choice depending upon antibiotic susceptibility testing, the person's health condition, medical history and severity of the disease.

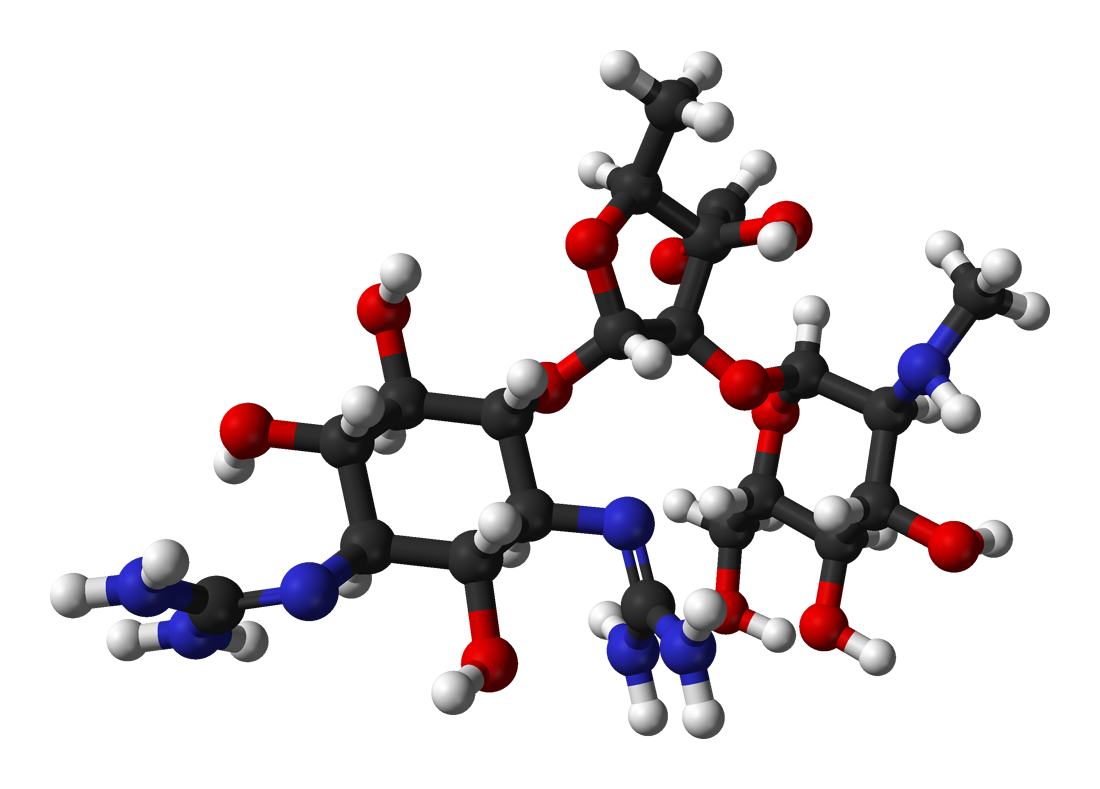
Streptomycin(Aminoglycoside)

Cephalosporin (core structure)

Klebsiella possesses beta-lactamase giving it resistance to ampicillin. Many strains have acquired an extended-spectrum beta-lactamase with additional resistance to carbenicillin, amoxicillin, and ceftazidime. The bacteria remain susceptible to aminoglycosides and some cephalosporins, and varying degrees of inhibition of the beta-lactamase with clavulanic acid have been reported. Infections due to multidrug-resistant gram-negative pathogens in the ICU have invoked the re-emergence of colistin. However, colistin-resistant strains of K. pneumoniae have been reported in ICUs. In 2009, strains of K. pneumoniae with gene called New Delhi metallo-beta-lactamase ( NDM-1) that even gives resistance against intravenous antibiotic carbapenem, were discovered in India and Pakistan. Klebsiella cases in Taiwan have shown abnormal toxicity, causing liver abscesses in people with diabetes mellitus (DM); treatment consists of third generation cephalosporins.

=== Hypervirulent Klebsiella pneumoniae ===
Hypervirulent (hvKp) is a rather recent K pneumoniae variant that is significantly more virulent than classical K. pneumoniae (cKp). While cKp is an opportunistic pathogen responsible for nosocomial infections that usually affect immunocompromised patients, hvKp is clinically more concerning since it also causes disease in healthy individuals and can infect virtually every site of the body. The genetic traits that lead to this pathotype are included in a large virulence plasmid and potentially on additional conjugative elements.

These newly identified strains were described to overproduce capsule components and siderophores for iron acquisition, among other factors. Although initial studies showed that hvKp is rather susceptible to antibiotic treatment, it has been recently shown that such strains can acquire resistance plasmids and become multiresistant to a variety of antibiotics.

It originated from Asia, having a high mortality rate among the population. It often spreads to central nervous system and eye causing endophthalmitis, nonhepatic abscesses, pneumonia, necrotizing fasciitis, and meningitis. One visual trait of these strains is hypermucoviscous phenotype and a string test can be used to help the diagnosis. Further examinations and treatments are made on a case-by-case basis, as there are currently no international guidelines.

Hypervirulent K. pneumoniae (hvKp) can also colonize the gastrointestinal tract of healthy individuals, facilitating its spread within communities. A study on Carbapenem-resistant hypervirulent Klebsiella pneumoniae (CR-hvKp) found that its infection leads to significant alterations in the gut microbiota, disrupting its structure and composition. The disruption of the gut microbiota undermines the host's immune defenses, making it more susceptible to systemic infections. The compromised gut barrier facilitates the translocation of CR-hvKp into the bloodstream, increasing the risk of systemic infections. The combination of gut microbiota disruption and compromised immunity contributes to higher mortality rates in CR-hvKp infections. These findings underscore the importance of maintaining gut microbiota integrity to prevent systemic dissemination of CR-hvKp and reduce associated mortality. Strategies aimed at preserving or restoring gut microbiota balance could be pivotal in managing CR-hvKp infections.

Studies have identified hvKp carriage in approximately 5–6% of healthy adults in Asia, suggesting a significant reservoir outside healthcare settings. Once colonized, person-to-person transmission, particularly via the fecal–oral route, is a plausible mechanism for community dissemination, especially in regions where hvKp is endemic.

Environmental Sources:

Beyond human carriers, hvKp has been isolated from various environmental sources, indicating potential non-human reservoirs. Notably, hvKp strains have been detected in:

- Ready-to-eat vegetables: ST23 hvKp strains carrying bla_KPC-2 were isolated from cucumbers in China in 2017.
- Pork samples: hvKp strains harboring the tigecycline resistance gene tet(X4) were found in pork from multiple Chinese markets in 2020.
- Public water environments: Multidrug-resistant hvKp strains were identified in Brazilian water sources in 2018.
- Fresh oysters: In 2024, Carbapenemase-producing hvKp strains were isolated from oysters in Egypt.

These findings underscore the importance of environmental surveillance and suggest that food and water sources could play roles in hvKp transmission.

== Epidemiology ==
Illness most commonly affects middle-aged and older men more often than women with debilitating diseases. This patient population is believed to have impaired respiratory host defenses, including persons with diabetes, alcoholism, malignancy, liver disease, chronic obstructive pulmonary disease, glucocorticoid therapy, kidney failure, and certain occupational exposures (such as paper mill workers). Many of these infections are obtained when a person is in the hospital for some other reason (a nosocomial infection).

In addition to pneumonia, Klebsiella can also cause infections in the urinary tract, lower biliary tract, and surgical wound sites. The range of clinical diseases includes pneumonia, thrombophlebitis, urinary tract infection, cholecystitis, diarrhea, upper respiratory tract infection, wound infection, osteomyelitis, meningitis, and bacteremia, and sepsis. For patients with an invasive device in their bodies, contamination of the device becomes a risk; neonatal ward devices, respiratory support equipment, and urinary catheters put patients at increased risk. Also, the use of antibiotics can be a factor that increases the risk of nosocomial infection with Klebsiella bacteria. Sepsis and septic shock can follow entry of the bacteria into the blood.

Research conducted at King's College, London has implicated molecular mimicry between HLA-B27 and two Klebsiella surface molecules as the cause of ankylosing spondylitis.

Klebsiella ranks second to E. coli for urinary tract infections in older people. It is also an opportunistic pathogen for patients with chronic pulmonary disease, enteric pathogenicity, nasal mucosa atrophy, and rhinoscleroma. New antibiotic-resistant strains of K. pneumoniae are appearing.

== Transmission ==
To get a K. pneumoniae infection, a person must be exposed to the bacteria. In other words, K. pneumoniae must enter the respiratory tract to cause pneumonia, or the blood to cause a bloodstream infection. In healthcare settings, K. pneumoniae bacteria can be spread through person-to-person contact (for example, contaminated hands of healthcare personnel, or other people via patient to patient) or, less commonly, by contamination of the environment; the role of transmission directly from the environment to patients is controversial and requires further investigation. However, the bacteria are not spread through the air. Patients in healthcare settings also may be exposed to K. pneumoniae when they are on ventilators, or have intravenous catheters or wounds. These medical tools and conditions may allow K. pneumoniae to enter the body and cause infection.

== Resistant strains ==
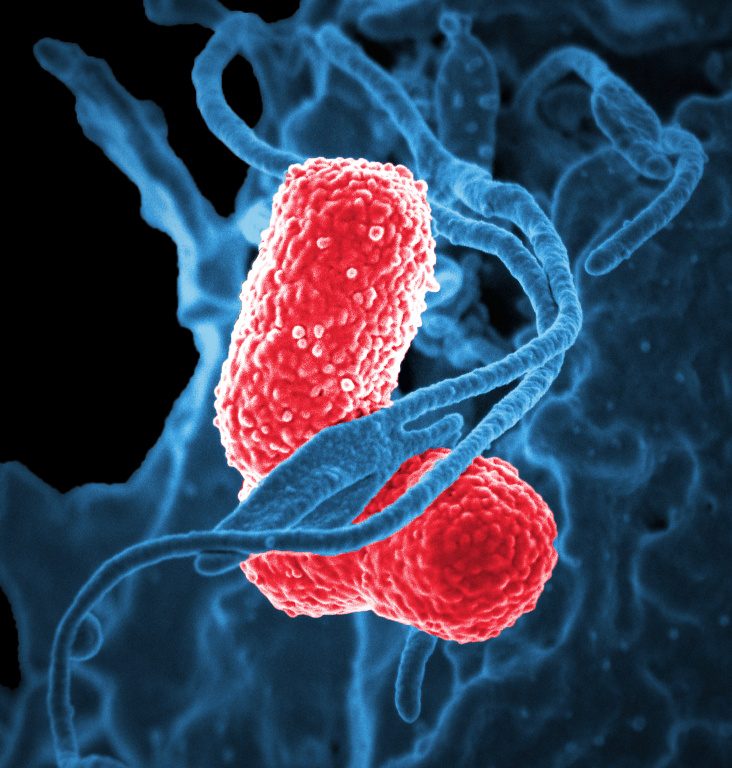
Multidrug-resistant Klebsiella pneumoniae

Klebsiella organisms are often resistant to multiple antibiotics. Current evidence implicates plasmids as the primary source of the resistance genes. Klebsiella species with the ability to produce extended-spectrum beta-lactamases (ESBL) are resistant to virtually all beta-lactam antibiotics, except carbapenems. Other frequent resistance targets include aminoglycosides, fluoroquinolones, tetracyclines, chloramphenicol, and trimethoprim/sulfamethoxazole.

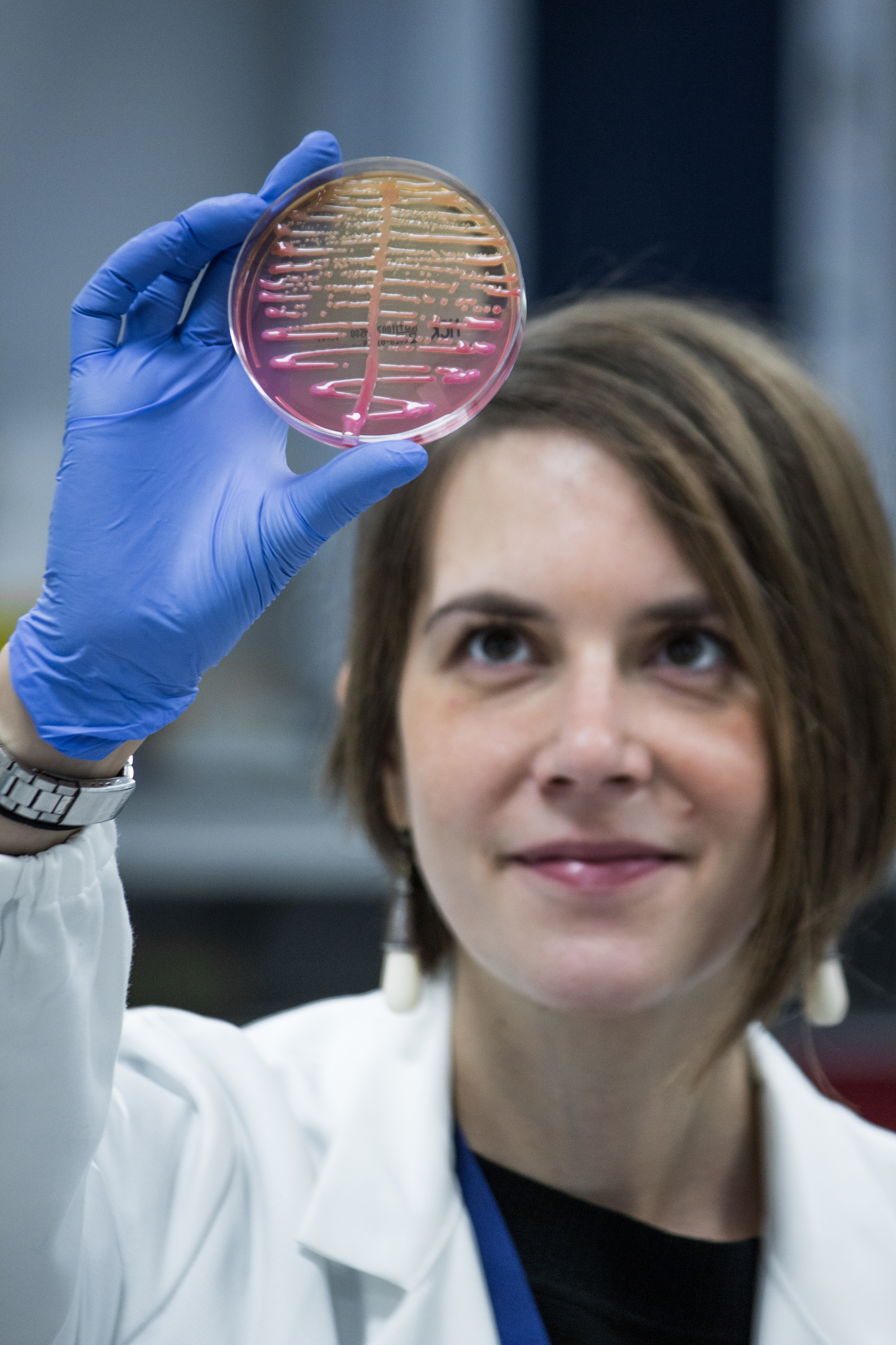
Growth of Klebsiella pneumoniae CRE from positive blood culture on MacConkey agar in Tuscany, where an outbreak was reported starting in November 2018 of strains producing NDM carbapenemase

Infection with carbapenem-resistant Enterobacteriaceae (CRE) or carbapenemase-producing Enterobacteriaceae is emerging as an important challenge in health-care settings. One of many CREs is carbapenem-resistant Klebsiella pneumoniae (CRKP). Over the past 10 years, a progressive increase in CRKP has been seen worldwide; however, this new emerging nosocomial pathogen is probably best known for an outbreak in Israel that began around 2006 within the healthcare system there. In the US, it was first described in North Carolina in 1996; since then CRKP has been identified in 41 states; and is routinely detected in certain hospitals in New York and New Jersey. It is now the most common CRE species encountered within the United States.

CRKP is resistant to almost all available antimicrobial agents, and infections with CRKP have caused high rates of morbidity and mortality, in particular among persons with prolonged hospitalization and those critically ill and exposed to invasive devices (e.g., ventilators or central venous catheters). The concern is that carbapenem is often used as a drug of last resort when battling resistant bacterial strains. New slight mutations could result in infections for which healthcare professionals can do very little, if anything, to treat patients with resistant organisms.

A number of mechanisms cause carbapenem resistance in the Enterobacteriaceae. These include hyperproduction of ampC beta-lactamase with an outer membrane porin mutation, CTX-M extended-spectrum beta-lactamase with a porin mutation or drug efflux, and carbapenemase production. The most important mechanism of resistance by CRKP is the production of a carbapenemase enzyme, bla_{KPC}. The gene that encodes the bla_{KPC} enzyme is carried on a mobile piece of genetic material (a transposon; the specific transposon involved is called Tn4401), which increases the risk for dissemination. CRE can be difficult to detect because some strains that harbor bla_{KPC} have minimum inhibitory concentrations that are elevated, but still within the susceptible range for carbapenems. Because these strains are susceptible to carbapenems, they are not identified as potential clinical or infection control risks using standard susceptibility testing guidelines. Patients with unrecognized CRKP colonization have been reservoirs for transmission during nosocomial outbreaks.

The extent and prevalence of CRKP within the environment is currently unknown. The mortality rate is also unknown, but has been observed to be as high as 44%. The Centers for Disease Control and Prevention released guidance for aggressive infection control to combat CRKP:

Place all patients colonized or infected with carbapenemase-producing Enterobacteriaceae on contact precautions. Acute-care facilities are to establish a protocol, in conjunction with the guidelines of the Clinical and Laboratory Standards Institute, to detect nonsusceptibility and carbapenemase production in Enterobacteriaceae, in particular Klebsiella spp. and Escherichia coli, and immediately alert epidemiology and infection-control staff members if identified. All acute-care facilities are to review microbiology records for the preceding 6–12 months to ensure that there have not been previously unrecognized CRE cases. If they do identify previously unrecognized cases, a point prevalence survey (a single round of active surveillance cultures) in units with patients at high risk (e.g., intensive-care units, units where previous cases have been identified, and units where many patients are exposed to broad-spectrum antimicrobials) is needed to identify any additional patients colonized with carbapenem-resistant or carbapenemase-producing Klebsiella spp. and E. coli. When a case of hospital-associated CRE is identified, facilities should conduct a round of active surveillance testing of patients with epidemiologic links to the CRE case (e.g., those patients in the same unit or patients having been cared for by the same health-care personnel).

In 2019, there were 192,530 global deaths attributed to resistant strains of Klebsiella pneumoniae.

Global deaths (counts) attributable to bacterial antimicrobial resistance by pathogen–drug combination, 2019
| | 3GC | 4GC | Amino-glycosides | Amino-penicillin | Anti-pseudomonal | BL−BLI | Carbapenems | Fluoro-quinolones | Macrolide | MDR & XDR | Meticillin | Mono INH | Mono RIF | Penicillin | TMP-SMX | Vancomycin | Total |
|---|---|---|---|---|---|---|---|---|---|---|---|---|---|---|---|---|---|
| Acinetobacter baumannii | 6,860 | 3,280 | 10,400 | | 13,300 | 811 | 57,700 | 40,000 | | | | | | | | | 132,351 |
| Citrobacter spp | 1,840 | 1,340 | 411 | | 2,170 | | 2,300 | 2,510 | | | | | | | | | 10,571 |
| Enterobacter spp | | 5320 | 3070 | | 9550 | | 15,300 | 7,800 | | | | | | | 4,650 | | 45,690 |
| Enterococcus faecalis | | | | | | | | 26,800 | | | | | | | | 3,420 | 30,220 |
| Enterococcus faecium | | | | | | | | 37,200 | | | | | | | | 14,300 | 51,500 |
| Other enterococci | | | | | | | | 12,200 | | | | | | | | 2,200 | 14,400 |
| Escherichia coli | 59,900 | | 11,700 | 10,500 | | 21,300 | 29,500 | 56,000 | | | | | | | 30,200 | | 219,100 |
| Group A Streptococcus | | | | | | | | | 3,630 | | | | | | | | 3,630 |
| Group B Streptococcus | | | | | | | | 11,500 | 13,500 | | | | | 799 | | | 25,799 |
| Haemophilus influenzae | 2,470 | | | 4,290 | | | | | | | | | | | | | 6,760 |
| Klebsiella pneumoniae | 50,100 | | 26,300 | | | 7,930 | 55,700 | 29,000 | | | | | | | 23,500 | | 192,530 |
| Morganella spp | 168 | 154 | | | | | | 427 | | | | | | | | | 749 |
| Mycobacterium tuberculosis | | | | | | | | | | 69,810 | | 11,600 | 3,350 | | | | 84,760 |
| Proteus spp | 4,730 | | 887 | 1,330 | | | | 2,970 | | | | | | | 1,620 | | 11,537 |
| Pseudomonas aeruginosa | 10,400 | 4,370 | 3,010 | | 10,300 | | 38,100 | 18,300 | | | | | | | | | 84,480 |
| Salmonella Paratyphi | | | | | | | | 4,040 | | 64 | | | | | | | 4,104 |
| Salmonella Typhi | | | | | | | | 17,200 | | 6,460 | | | | | | | 23,660 |
| Non-typhoidal Salmonella | | | | | | | | 5,620 | | | | | | | | | 5,620 |
| Serratia spp | 1,100 | 2,610 | 953 | | | | 2,450 | 1,080 | | | | | | | | | 8,193 |
| Shigella spp | | | | | | | | 5,990 | | | | | | | | | 5,990 |
| Staphylococcus aureus | | | | | 2,480 | | | 15,900 | 19,600 | | 121,000 | | | | 18,700 | 3,120 | 180,800 |
| Streptococcus pneumoniae | 3,330 | | | | | 2,040 | 41,900 | 11,200 | 12,500 | | | | | 12,400 | 38,700 | | 122,070 |
| Total | 140,898 | 17,074 | 56,731 | 16,120 | 37,800 | 32,081 | 242,950 | 305,737 | 49,230 | 76,334 | 121,000 | 11,600 | 3,350 | 12,199 | 117,370 | 23,040 | 1,264,514 |

=== Local outbreaks ===
Israel 2007–2008. A nationwide outbreak of CRE in Israel peaked in March 2007 at 55.5 cases per 100,000 patient days and necessitated a nationwide treatment plan. The intervention entailed physical separation of all CRE carriers and appointment of a task force to oversee efficacy of isolation by closely monitoring hospitals and intervening when necessary. After the treatment plan (measured in May 2008), the number of cases per 100,000 patient days decreased to 11.7. The plan was effective because of strict hospital compliance, wherein each was required to keep detailed documentation of all CRE carriers. In fact, for each increase in compliance by 10%, incidence of cases per 100,000 patient days decreased by 0.6. Therefore, containment on a nationwide scale requires nationwide intervention.

Nevada 2016. In mid-August 2016, a resident of Washoe County was hospitalized in Reno due to a CRE (specifically Klebsiella pneumoniae) infection. In early September of the same year, she developed septic shock and died. On testing by CDC an isolate from the patient was found to be resistant to all 26 antibiotics available in the US, including drug of last resort colistin. It is believed she may have picked up the microbe while hospitalized in India for two years due to a broken right femur and subsequent femur and hip infections.

== Antimicrobial resistance gene transfer ==
Klebsiella pneumoniae carries a large number of anti-microbial resistance genes (AMR genes). These genes are transferred via plasmids from and to other human pathogens. One human pathogen that commonly acquires AMR genes from Klebsiella pneumoniae is Salmonella. This could help with treatment of salmonella infections due to having knowledge of possible antibiotic resistance data.

The majority of AMR genes in Klebsiella pneumoniae are plasmid-borne. An example of a niche would be soil, often considered a hotspot for gene transfer.

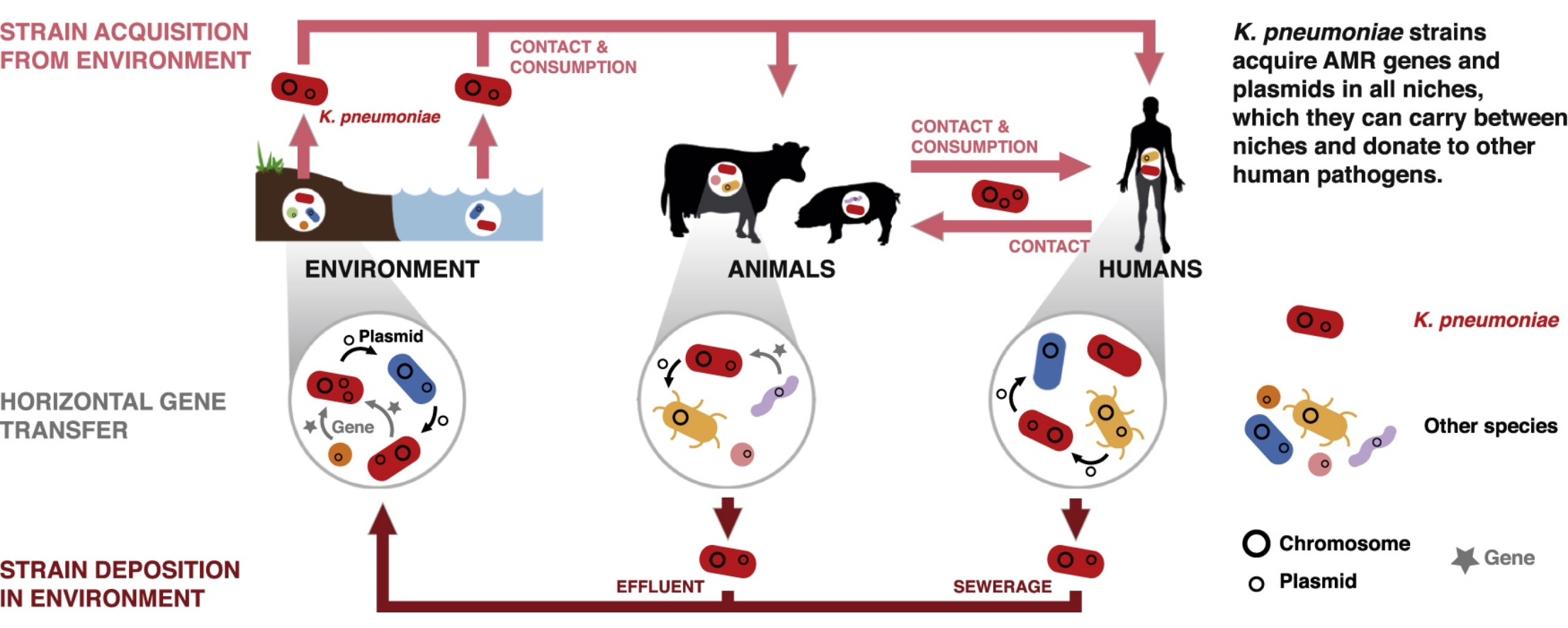
Horizontal gene transfer of AMR genes by Klebsiella pneumoniae

| | Total AMR genes per spp | Average plasmids |
|---|---|---|
| Acinetobacter baumannii | 278 | 1.5 |
| Pseudomonas aeruginosa | 263 | 0 |
| Klebsiella pneumoniae | 410 | 2.5 |
| Enterobacter cloacae | 277 | 2.2 |
| Escherichia coli | 204 | 1 |

The table shows the number of AMR genes and plasmids (per strain or subspecies) compared to other common bacteria species.

== Prevention ==
To prevent spreading Klebsiella infections between patients, healthcare personnel must follow specific infection-control precautions, which may include strict adherence to hand hygiene (preferably using an alcohol based hand rub (60–90%) or soap and water if hands are visibly soiled. Alcohol based hand rubs are effective against these Gram-negative bacilli) and wearing gowns and gloves when they enter rooms where patients with Klebsiella-related illnesses are housed. Healthcare facilities also must follow strict cleaning procedures to prevent the spread of Klebsiella.

To prevent the spread of infections, patients also should clean their hands very often, including:

- Before preparing or eating food
- Before touching their eyes, nose, or mouth
- Before and after changing wound dressings or bandages
- After using the restroom
- After blowing their nose, coughing, or sneezing
- After touching hospital surfaces such as bed rails, bedside tables, doorknobs, remote controls, or the phone

== Treatment ==
K. pneumoniae can be treated with antibiotics if the infections are not drug-resistant. Infections by K. pneumoniae can be difficult to treat because fewer antibiotics are effective against them. In such cases, a microbiology laboratory must run tests to determine which antibiotics will treat the infection. More specific treatments of Klebsiella pneumonia are given in its section above. For urinary tract infections with multidrug-resistant Klebsiella species, a combination therapy with amikacin and meropenem has been suggested.

== Research ==
Multiple drug-resistant K. pneumoniae strains have been killed in vivo by intraperitoneal, intravenous, or intranasal administration of phages in laboratory tests. Resistance to phages is not likely to be as troublesome as to antibiotics as new infectious phages are likely to be available in environmental reservoirs. Phage therapy can be used in conjunction with antibiotics, to supplement their activity instead of replacing it altogether.

== Vaccine development ==
New data sources outlining the global burden of K. pneumoniae and drug-resistant forms are expected to build momentum into prophylactic vaccine development. The recent 2022 IHME study showed that in 2019 K. pneumoniae was responsible for 790,000 deaths [571,000–1,060,000] in all age groups across 11 infectious syndromes. Importantly, in Sub-saharan Africa K. pneumoniae was responsible for 124,000 [89,000–167,000] neonatal deaths due to bloodstream infections. Based on these and other data, a newly developed prophylactic vaccine would ideally be designed to prevent invasive K. pneumoniae disease in both vulnerable persons but also as a maternal vaccine to prevent neonatal sepsis and global demand assessments have been published. As of June 2023, one single clinical development program for a K. pneumoniae vaccine [Kleb4V/GSK4429016A] was in a Phase 1/2 study in healthy adults aged 18–70 yrs (n=166) [Clinical trials identifier: NCT04959344]. The vaccine is an O-antigen based conjugate where the specific O-antigens in the vaccine remain undisclosed [Michael Kowarik, LimmaTech Biologics, World Vaccine Congress EU, 2022] although only a limited number of O-serotypes can account for a high proportion of clinical isolates. A recent Q1 2024 GSK Corporate R&D pipeline update showed that Kleb4V/GSK4429016A had been removed. The status of the program is now subject to verification.
