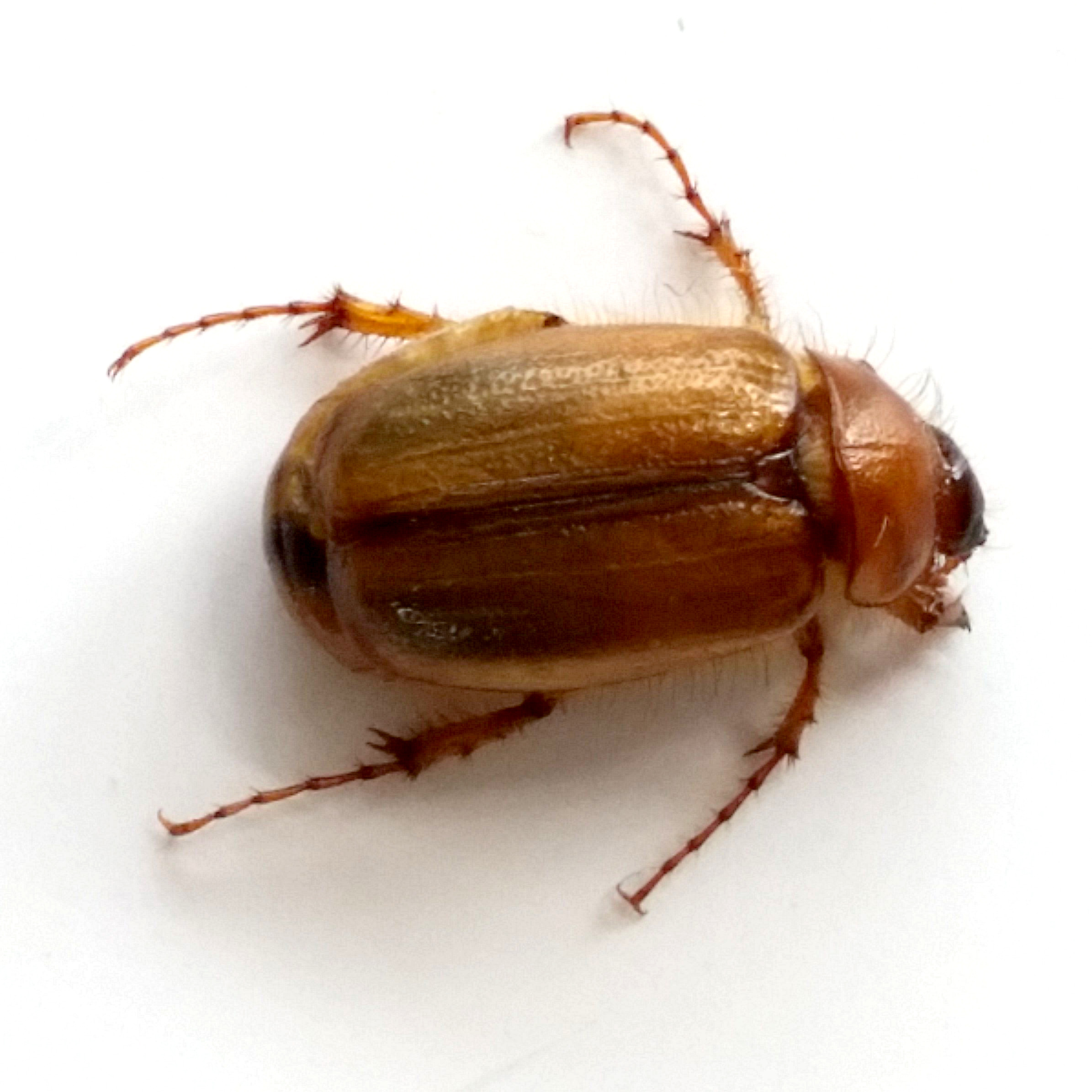

Scientific classification
- Kingdom: Animalia
- Phylum: Arthropoda
- Class: Insecta
- Order: Coleoptera
- Suborder: Polyphaga
- Infraorder: Scarabaeiformia
- Family: Scarabaeidae
- Genus: Costelytra
- Species: C. giveni

Binomial name
- Costelytra giveni Coca-Abia & Romero-Samper, 2016

Synonyms
- Prior to 2016 mischaracterized as Costelytra zealandicus (White, 1846)

= Costelytra giveni =

New Zealand grass grub

Species of beetle

Costelytra giveni (mischaracterized as Costelytra zealandica prior to 2016), commonly known as New Zealand grass grub, is a scarab beetle that is endemic to New Zealand and is a prevalent pasture pest.

== Taxonomy ==
Costelytra giveni was first described by B.B. Given in 1952, though he mischaracterized specimens as C. zealandica. In 2016, Coca-Abia and Romero-Samper found differences in syntype specimens between White's (1846) C. zealandica and Given's (1952) description, and revised the species name of the latter to C. giveni after Given.

== Identification/description ==
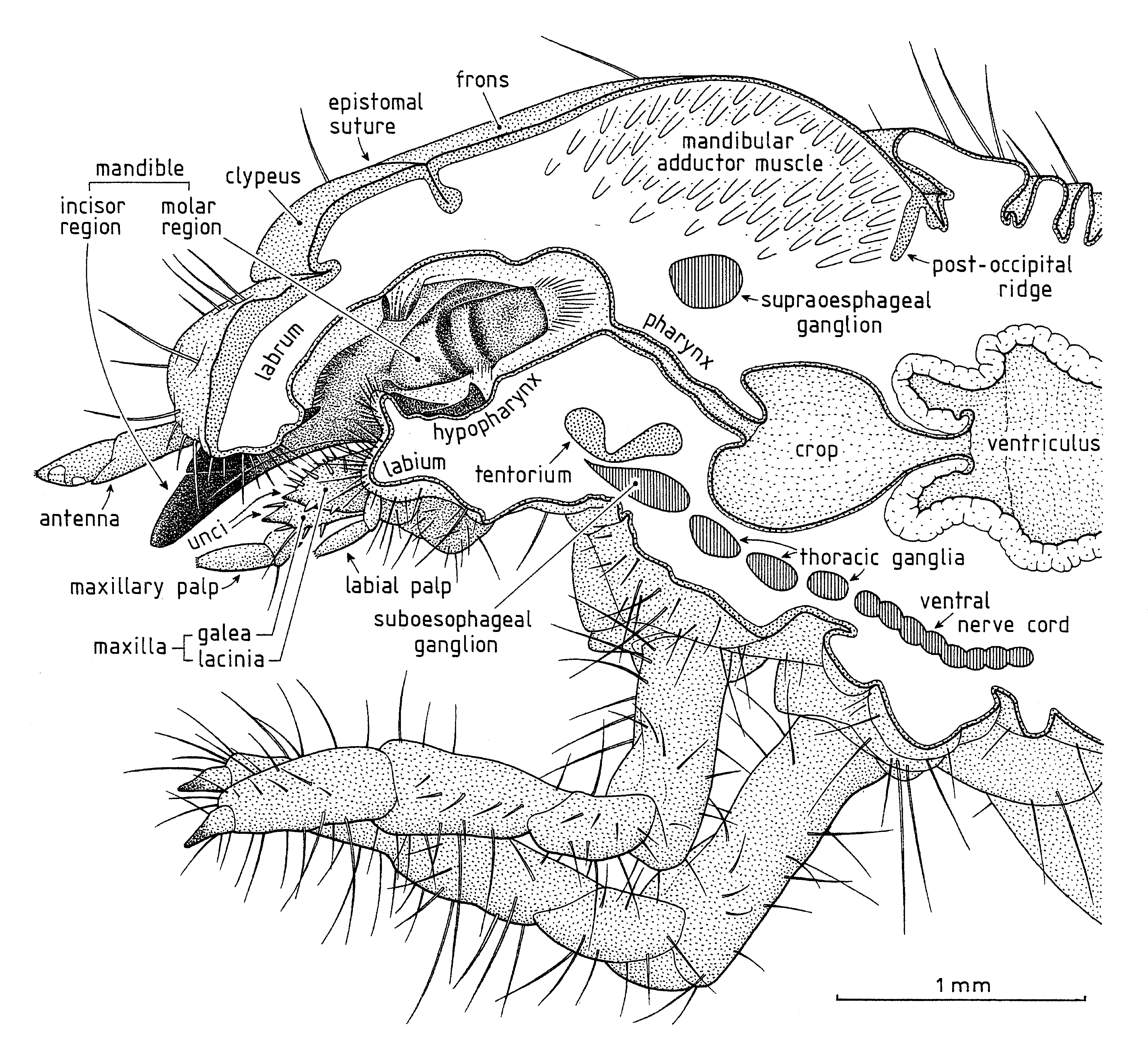
Costelytra giveni illustrated by Des Helmore showing the internal morphology

New Zealand grass grubs are one of the most common insects in New Zealand. Grass grubs belong to the holometabolous insect group, this means that they have a life cycle with four stages: egg, larva, pupa, adult. The adult beetle can grow up to a mature length of 13 mm. It has a shiny brown colouring with a thick wing covering called an elytra. Adult beetles also have a prominent plate-like piece covering the thorax called the pronotum. These adults can be seen flying in the evenings during the summer months.

Female adults lay up to 100 eggs at a time into wet or loose soil, 10–15 days after mating. Eggs are small, white, oval shaped and around 1.5 mm in diameter. 3–4 days after being laid, the eggs turn smooth, spherical, and start to swell by absorbing moisture. Once the eggs are mature they turn a dark brown/black colour.

On hatching larvae have a whitish/grey C-shaped segmented body, with a darker coloured head and dark brown jaws (mandibles). The larvae have three pairs of legs (true legs) attached to the underside of the segment behind the head, called the thorax. The length of the larvae ranges from 5 mm, when newly hatched, to 25 mm at larval maturity. Newly hatched larvae weigh 2–3 mg and grow up to 200 mg. The most obvious characteristic of larva is that the abdomen is very swollen and looks a lot bigger than any other part of the body. There are many thin fine hairs along both sides of the body, especially around the abdomen. Occasionally, grass grub larvae can be found that are purple/yellow or green in colour, these are diseased.

The pupae start off the same creamy white colour as the larvae, but slowly turn to a dark brown during pupation. They have a soft body and are generally shorter and thicker than the grass grub larvae, they grow to between 10–30 mm in length. The pupae have a thin translucent skin called the epidermal layer, through which the developing wings and legs can be seen.

== Distribution ==
Costelytra giveni is endemic to and found throughout New Zealand. There are, however, similar species found in other countries like Acrossidius tasmaniae, the Tasmanian grass grub found in Tasmania, Australia. Grass grubs prefer altitudes below 1200m, with favored soil types being free-draining loam soils, but they are also found in peaty or sandy soils.

== Life cycle/phenology ==
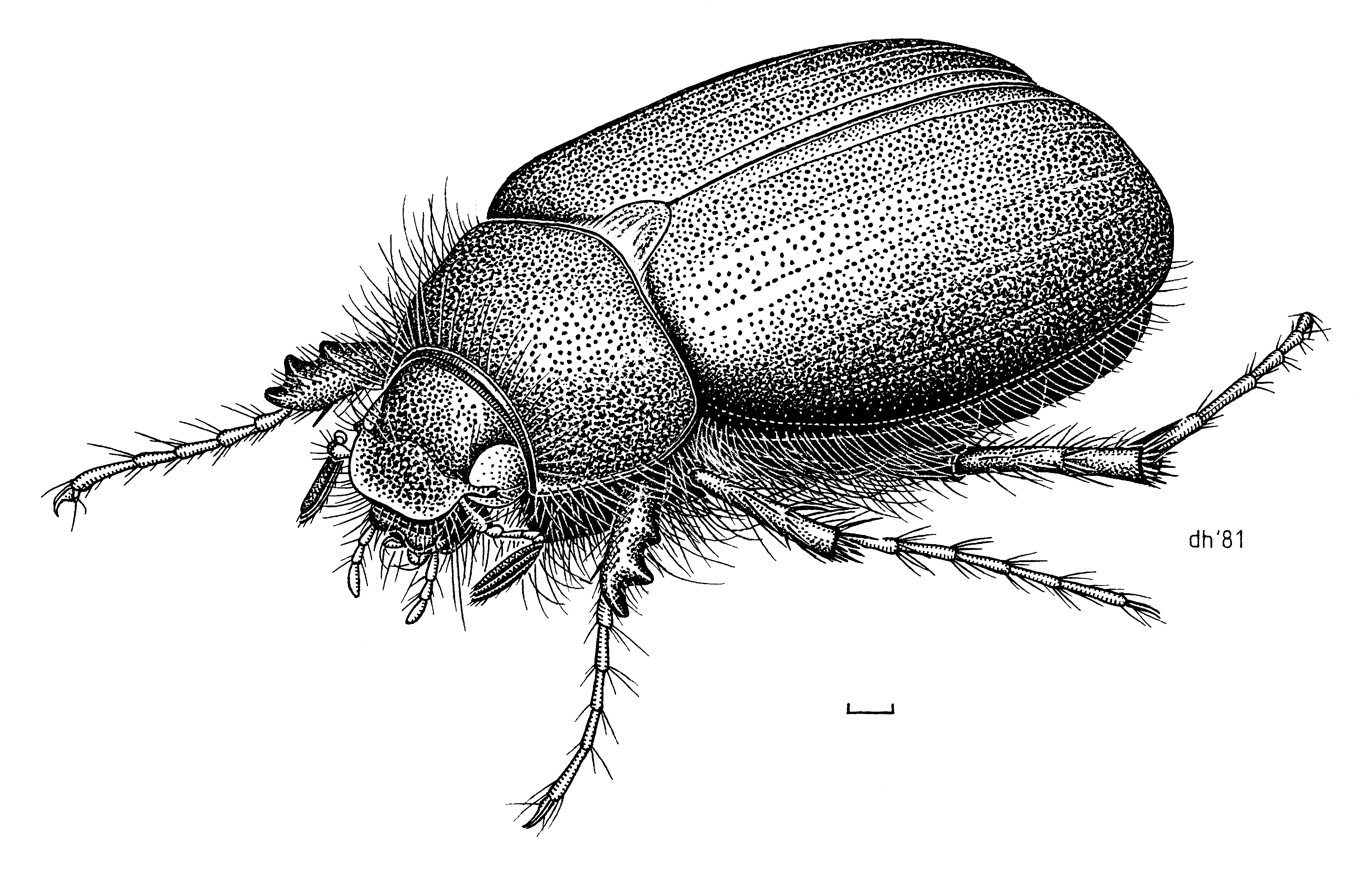
Costelytra giveni illustration by Des Helmore

New Zealand grass grub has an annual life cycle, taking typically one year under normal climatic conditions but can take up to two years in adverse weather such as drought or significant cold periods (this also includes periods where the soil moisture is very high), or due to a food shortage. Over that one-year period the adult beetles live for 4–6 weeks emerging in spring (October – December) when the air temperature is above 10 degrees Celsius, and undertake two main flights, the first flight is to mate and the second and consecutive are to feed and lay clutches of eggs. Females are the last to emerge from the soil, this leads to localized infestations due to them being unable to reach a significant distance before being mated. Egg cluster size can range from 5-80 eggs and range from 80–250 mm below the surface of the soil. Females can lay two to three clusters over a two to three week period. Costelytra giveni larvae hatch between November and March (depending on the time they were laid). They start to feed on roots of clover and pasture plants from the time they hatch until September. They undergo three stages (instars) before pupation.

During the summer months, the grubs moult and reach their second instar phase. By early autumn, they are usually fully grown and have reached their third instar phase. This is when they are the most detrimental to pastures as it is the final feeding phase before winter. In late autumn and during winter, they retreat down from the top 5 cm of soil and burrow down between 50–200 mm into the soil. During this phase, the grubs undergo a colour change from grayish/white into a yellow/cream colour. Once they reach the appropriate depth, the grub empties its stomach and starts to form a smooth oval shaped cell. The developing wings and legs can be seen through the then-translucent skin (epidermal layer) as develops. The size range of pupae is 10–30 mm in length. This procedure takes place over 30–40 days.

The change from pupa to mature beetle takes place over 4–6 weeks, but they remain in the soil for up to a week to let the newly formed outer skin harden, then it proceeds to dig its way up to the surface of the pasture.

The grass grub populations usually increase in a 3-5 year cycle before crashing, usually due to a buildup of disease in the soil.

== Diet and foraging ==
The larvae of C. giveni tend to feed on fine roots of pasture plants like perennial ryegrass (Lolium perenne) and white clover (Trifolium repens).

Originally, only native species of grasses such as tussocks were affected, but they have subsequently adapted to feed on the exotic species that have been brought into New Zealand, as their abundance continues to grow. Adult beetles feed on leaves of trees, shrubs, brassicas and foliage of pasture crops. If there is a concentrated group of beetles flying in one area, there is potential to defoliate seedling crops and fruit trees.

== Predators, parasites, and diseases ==
There are some species of pasture grasses, legumes, and herbs that are naturally tolerant of grass grubs including cocksfoot (Dactylis glomerata), tall fescue (Festuca arundinacea) and chicory (Cichorium intybus) and some that are resistant like Phalaris (Phalaris aquatica), lucerne, (Alfalfa), (Medicago sativa) and lotus (Lotus uliginosus), (Lotus major).

Predators

Because they are insects, grass grubs fall prey to almost all bird species present in the same areas. Great black backed gulls (Larus marinus) prey on the grubs especially in areas undergoing cultivation. Starlings (Sturnus vulgaris) and black birds (Turdus merula) seem to favour grass grub larvae in their third instar phase, as well as the adult beetle, and are often seen actively digging through the soil in areas with a high grub population. Another common predator is the hedgehog (Erinaceus europaeus) whose intake of grass grubs can be up to 40% of the total diet of an adult hedgehog. There are a few invertebrate predators but they are not common in pastures.

Parasites

There have been recordings of Diptera species being parasites and predators of New Zealand grass grub, an example is Proscissio cana (Tachinidae) which parasitizes larvae in the third instar phase and is present in the Canterbury High country, but it only parasitizes around 20% of larvae present. In November 2012, researchers in New Zealand discovered an unknown maggot preying on grass grub larvae, with 35-50% of the grubs in the nearby area being parasitized. DNA samples from these maggots were not matched to any known species so a sample was collected and allowed to pupate, and they were finally identified as Ostenia robusta (Dolichopodidae). This is the sole species in the genus Ostenia, is endemic to New Zealand and not much is known about its biology or ecology.

Diseases

Because grass grub build up large colonies in the soil, disease can spread quickly and be devastating to the population. The most common disease of the New Zealand Grass Grub is Amber disease. Amber disease is a chronic infection of the stomach of grass grub larvae, and is caused by two strains of bacteria, Serratia entomophila and S. proteamaculans. The bacteria S. entomophila is available for purchase commercially as a biocontrol agent. Once these pathogenic bacteria have been ingested, the infected larvae stop eating within 2–5 days, and gain an amber colouring due to the stomach emptying, and the levels of major digestive enzymes (trypsin and chymotrypsin) in the mid-gut decreasing. However, the infected larvae take 1–3 months to die after becoming infected. Amber disease can carry over into following generations as it is applied at a subsurface level of soil. It was first isolated in Mid Canterbury, New Zealand in 1981. Yersinia entomophaga was first isolated from diseased grass grub larvae and is also being studied for biological pest control.

== Cultural uses ==
The Māori name for C. giveni is Tutaeruru. Grass grubs are very damaging to agricultural communities. Loss in crop productivity can be the cause of economic loss. Previous findings show that the cost of crop damage due to C. giveni is said to be around $89 million per year.
