= Conoderus collaris =

Scientific classification
- Kingdom: Animalia
- Phylum: Arthropoda
- Class: Insecta
- Order: Coleoptera
- Suborder: Polyphaga
- Infraorder: Elateriformia
- Family: Elateridae
- Genus: Monocrepidius
- Species: M. collaris

Binomial name
- Monocrepidius collaris (Candèze, 1859)

Synonyms
- Drasterius collaris Candèze, 1859 var. nigricollis Fleutiaux, 1918; Prodrasterius nigricollis Fleutiaux, 1928; Prodrasterius collaris taiwanus Kishti, 1996

Species of beetle

Conoderus collaris or Prodrasterius collaris, is a species of click beetle found in Indian subregion from Pakistan, Assam to Sri Lanka.
