= Māori potatoes =

Varieties of potato cultivated by Māori people

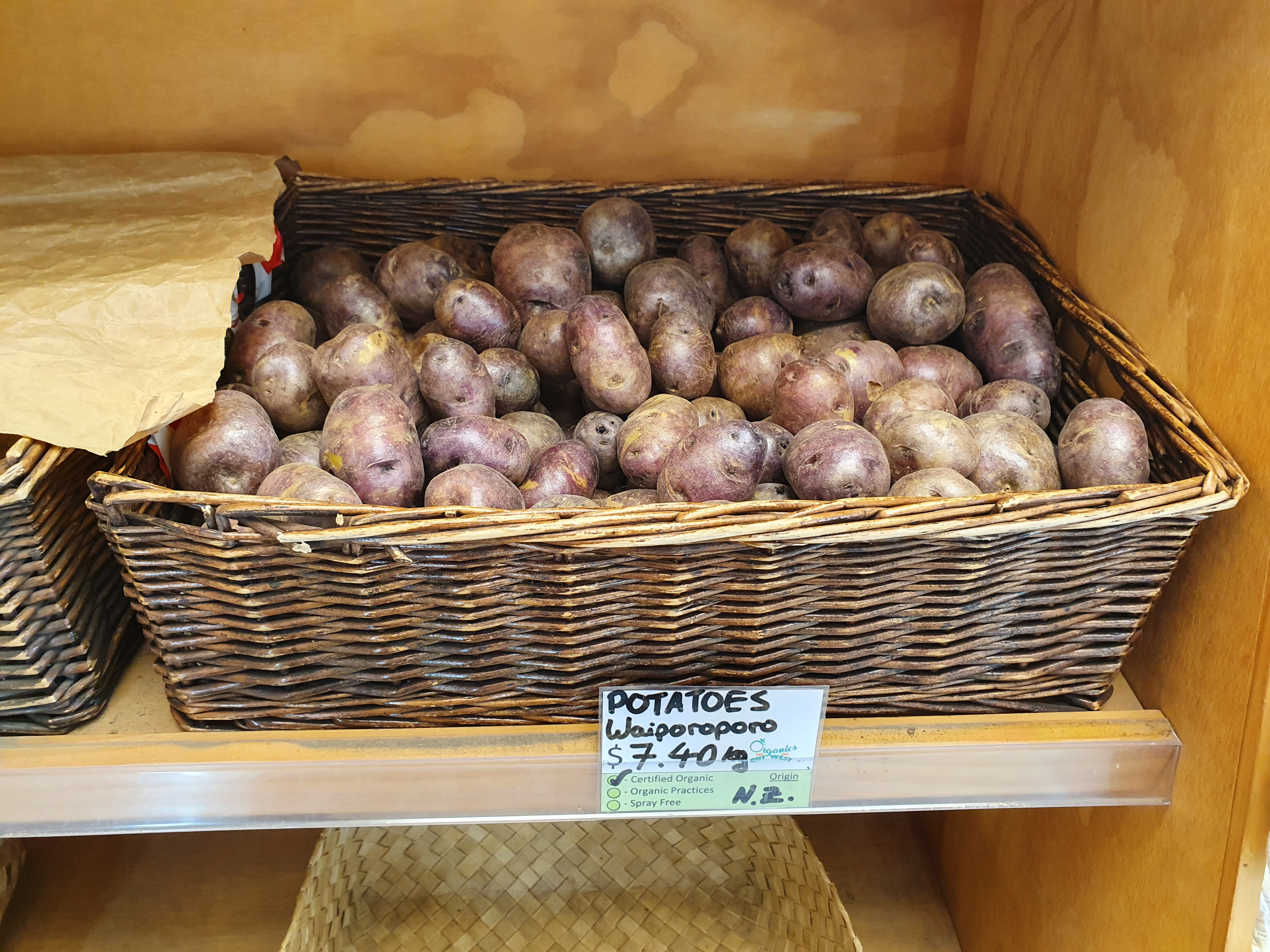
Waiporoporo taewa for sale in New Zealand

Māori potatoes or taewa are varieties of potato (Solanum tuberosum subsp. tuberosum and andigena) cultivated by Māori people, especially those grown before New Zealand was colonised by the British.

Māori have grown potatoes for at least 200 years, and "taewa" refers collectively to some traditional varieties, including Karuparerā, Huakaroro, Raupī, Moemoe, and Tūtae-kurī. These are smaller, knobblier, and more colourful than modern potato varieties, which are referred to by the loanword pārete. Other collective names for traditional Māori potatoes are rīwai, parareka and mahetau.

Māori potatoes are commonly used as a base ingredient in rēwena bread.

== Origins and history ==
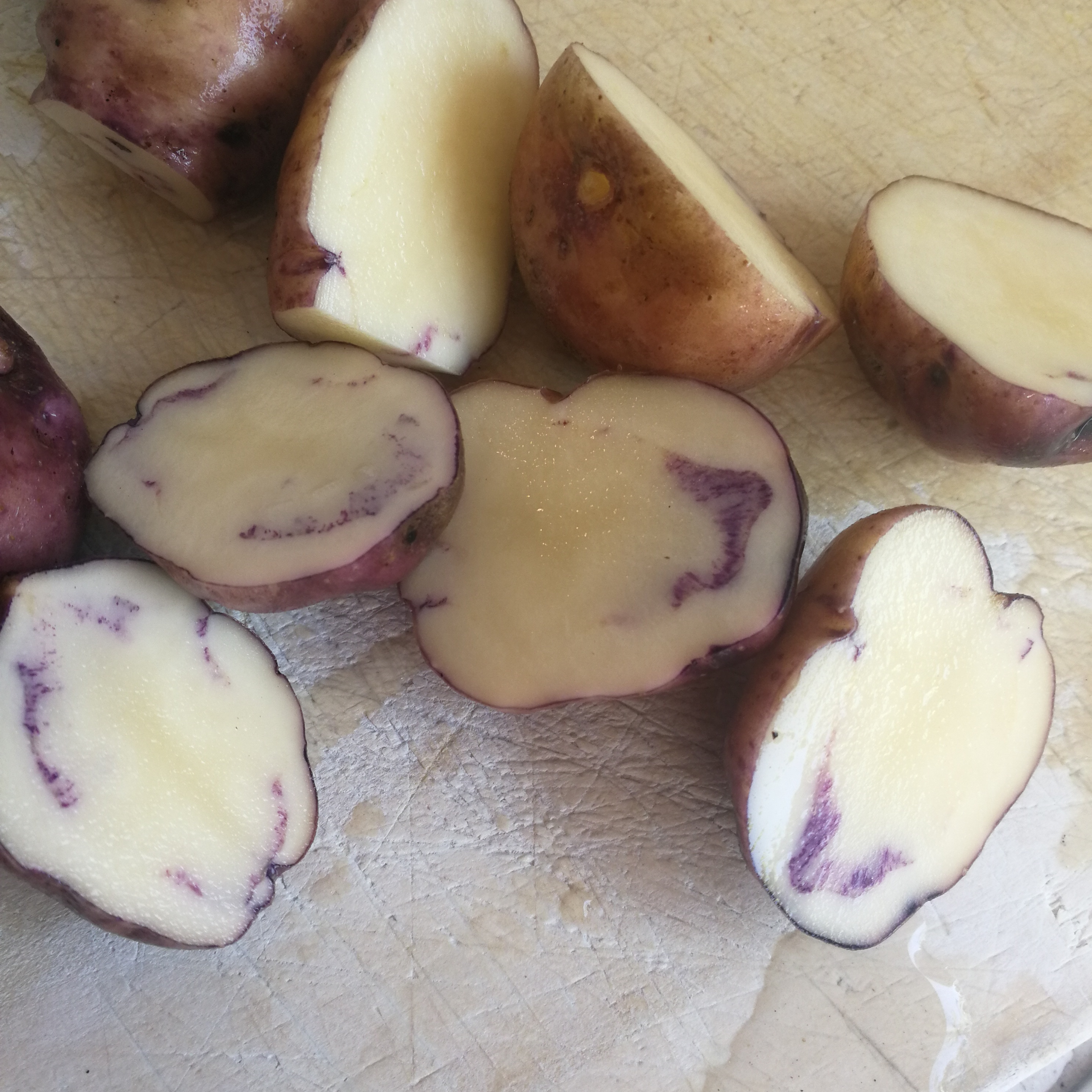
Whataroa potato (taewa), an example of a Māori potato

Potatoes originate in the Andes and temperate Chile, and were introduced into Europe in the second half of the 16th century, as part of the Columbian exchange.

Māori traditions maintain that taewa were cultivated well before Europeans first visited New Zealand. Despite this, James Cook is presumed by academic scholars to have introduced potatoes to New Zealand in his first voyage (1769), as is Marion de Fresne. More South American varieties came with sealers and whalers in the early 19th century.

Taewa became a staple Māori food crop before organised European settlement, displacing traditional crops such as sweet potatoes (Māori: kūmara), taro, yams (Māori: uwhi) and bracken fern root (Māori: aruhe) as a primary carbohydrate source. Taewa were able to grow in cooler climates, and were easier to store than kūmara.

They were also an important trade good during the first period of European contact with New Zealand around 1800 onwards. Māori grew taewa commercially until the late 19th century but these were gradually supplanted by larger commercial potato varieties from Europe, which have higher yields. Māori have continued to grow traditional varieties, passing them from generation to generation. This selection over time has made them hardy and mostly disease resistant.

== Cultivation ==
Taewa are generally grown with the same techniques and technology as commercial varieties. Taewa tend to produce more tubers per plant, but they are smaller than modern potatoes. Traditionally, they are planted in spring, with maintenance tasks during the summer, and harvest in late autumn. Crops were planted according to the maramataka using crop rotation methods, and wood ash for fertiliser. All levels of society took part in production and harvesting.

== Naming ==
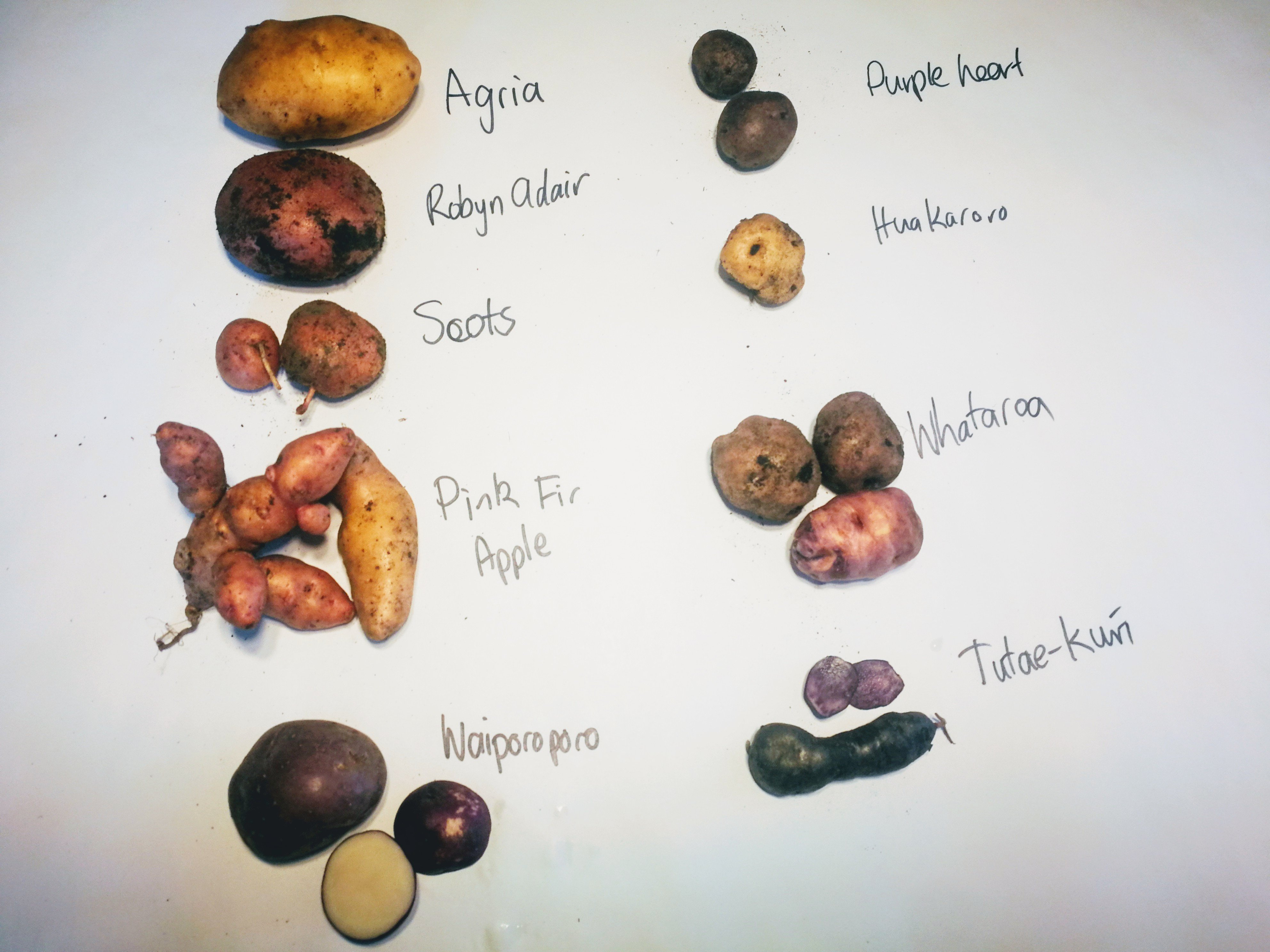
Photographic guide to different potatoes and taewa, including waiporoporo, huakaroro, whataroa and urenika (tūtae kurī).

Some taewa are known by multiple names. Koanga Institute have identified several that are in fact the same variety of potato such as karoro and peru ma.

=== Varieties of taewa ===
- Amuri (a.k.a. Richard Watson)
- Catriona
- Chatham Hollomby
- Chatham Island
- Huakaroro / Karoro / Peru Ma
- Kereopa / Ngateuteu
- Kowiniwini
- Maori Chief
- Maori / Roke Roke / Waikato
- Matariki
- Moemoe
- Paraketia
- Pawhero
- Stewart Island
- Taranaki
- Urenika / Tūtae Kurī
- Wai-iti / Whanaako Ngati Porou
- Waitai
- Whataroa
- Whero Whero

== Pests and disease ==
Prior to widespread European settlement, taewa did not suffer much from pests or disease. The biggest pests were native caterpillars which were controlled through fumigation using kauri gum or dried kawakawa leaves (Piper excelsum).

=== Common pests ===
Today, insect pests include potato tuber moth (Phthorimaea operculella) and wireworm (Conoderus exsul) which both feed on leaves, stems, and may directly damage tubers.

Aphids in particular are considered vectors for diseases. Taewa can be affected by green peach aphid (Myzus persicae), foxglove aphid (Aulacorthum solani), and potato aphid (Macrosiphum euphorbiae).

Green looper caterpillar (Chrysodeixis eriosoma) and hadda beetle (Henosepilachna vigintioctopunctata) can also affect taewa, but generally only cause damage to the plant's foliage.

Tomato and potato psyllid (Bactericera cokerelli) arrived in New Zealand in 2006 and poses a threat to many solanaceous crops, including taewa. Psyllids can reduce crop yields by up to 80%.

Rats (Rattus rattus and Rattus norvegicus) and wild pigs (Sus scrofa) are known to attack tubers, while pūkeko (Porphyrio porphryio melanotus), rabbits (Oryctolagus cuniculus) and hares (Lepus europaeus) may attack new foliage.

=== Common diseases ===
Taewa are susceptible to potato leafroll virus, potato virus y, potato virus x, and potato virus s. These are spread by aphids, machinery, and the propagation of infected tubers.

As well as viruses, taewa can be infected by a range of fungal diseases. Late blight (Phytophthroa infestans), pink rot (Phytopthora erythroseptica), Verticillium wilt (Verticillium albo-atrum and V. dahliae), and Fusarium dry rot (Fusarium sambucinum) have the biggest potential impacts on crops.

Early blight (Alternaria solani), stem canker (Rhizoctonia solani), powdery scab (Spongospora subterranea), and silver scurf (Helminthosporium solani) will damage plants to a lesser degree.

It has been noted that the varieties huakaroro, karupārera, and tūtaekurī show a small natural resistance to late blight. Powdery scab is more likely to affect huakaroro and urenika, while karupārera and moemoe appear highly resistant. The variety pawhero is particularly susceptible to Fusarium dry rot, which affects its ability to be stored.

Common scab (Streptomyces scabies) may cause cosmetic damage to tubers. Bacterial soft rot (Erwinia carotovora) and Liberibacter and Zebra chip (Candidatus liberibacter solanacearum) may cause significant crop loss.
