= Monocrepidius elegans =

Scientific classification
- Domain: Eukaryota
- Kingdom: Animalia
- Phylum: Arthropoda
- Class: Insecta
- Order: Coleoptera
- Suborder: Polyphaga
- Infraorder: Elateriformia
- Family: Elateridae
- Subfamily: Agrypninae
- Genus: Monocrepidius
- Species: M. elegans

Binomial name
- Monocrepidius elegans (Candèze, 1878)

Synonyms
- Conoderus elegans Candèze, 1878

Species of beetle

Monocrepidius elegans is a species of click beetles (insects in the family Elateridae). It has a Palaearctic distribution.
