= Yersinia entomophaga =

Scientific classification
- Domain: Bacteria
- Kingdom: Pseudomonadati
- Phylum: Pseudomonadota
- Class: Gammaproteobacteria
- Order: Enterobacterales
- Family: Yersiniaceae
- Genus: Yersinia
- Species: Y. entomophaga

Binomial name
- Yersinia entomophaga Hurst et al., 2011

Species of bacterium

Yersinia entomophaga is a species of bacteria that was originally isolated from the diseased larvae of the New Zealand grass grub, Costelytra zealandica. The type strain is MH96 (= DSM 22339 = ATCC BAA-1678). It is currently being studied for biological pest control of insect pests like the porina moth, Wiseana cervinata.

== Etymology ==
The name is derived from entomon, adj., cut up, segmented animal (used to refer to an insect) and phagos (voracious eater); N.L. fem. n. entomophaga insect eater.
