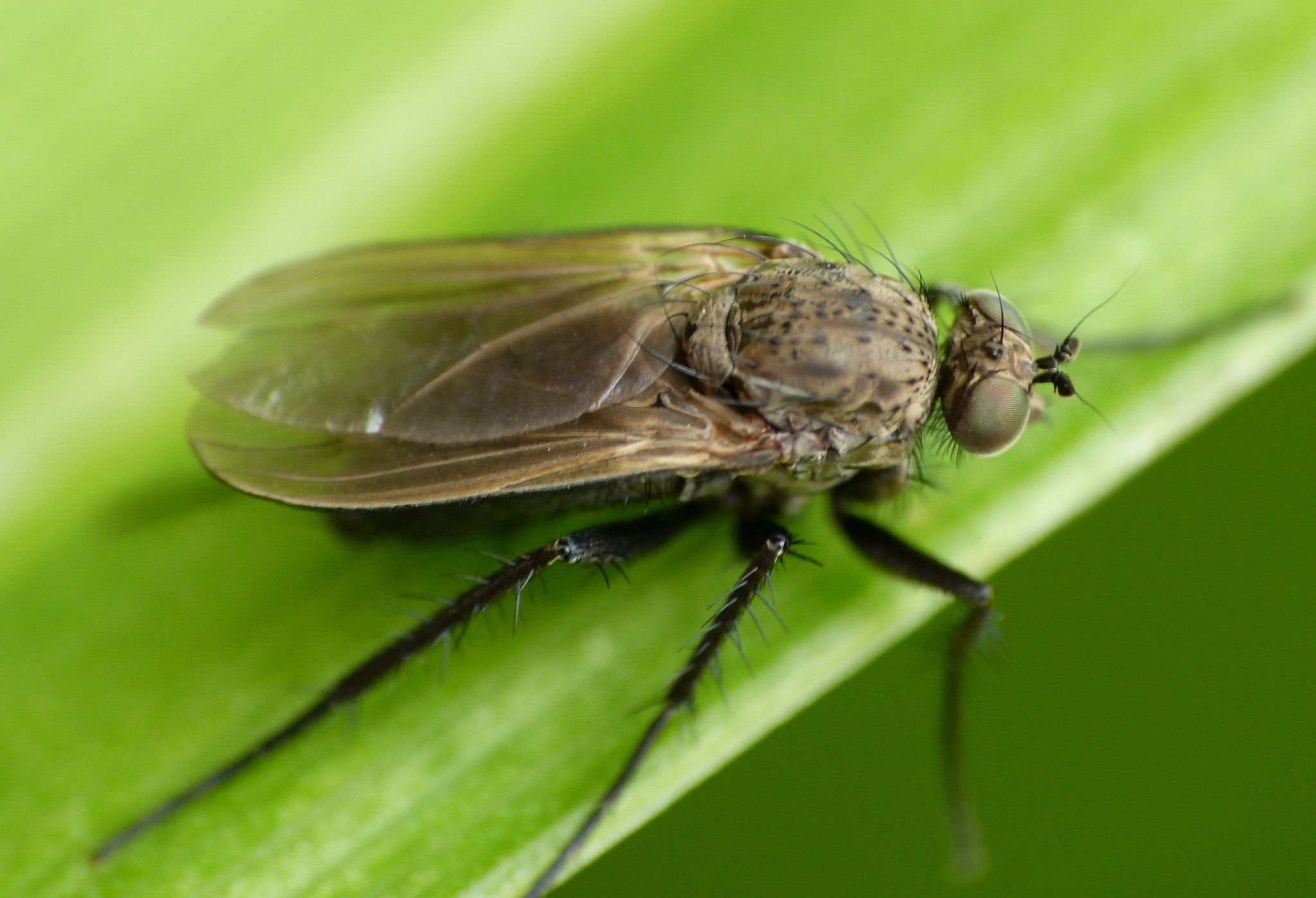

Scientific classification
- Kingdom: Animalia
- Phylum: Arthropoda
- Class: Insecta
- Order: Diptera
- Family: Dolichopodidae
- Subfamily: Diaphorinae
- Genus: Ostenia; Hutton, 1901
- Species: O. robusta

Binomial name
- Ostenia robusta Hutton, 1901

= Ostenia =

Genus of flies

Ostenia is a genus of flies in the family Dolichopodidae. It contains only one species, Ostenia robusta, which is endemic to New Zealand. The species was first described by Frederick Hutton in 1901, and the genus was named after Carl Robert Osten-Sacken.

Not much is known about the biology or ecology of the species. In 2012 and 2013, O. robusta larvae were found feeding on pupae of Costelytra zealandica (grass grub), suggesting that O. robusta are predators of C. zealandia pupae. However, later observations in 2014 and 2015 contradicted these findings.
