= Monocrepidius falli =

Scientific classification
- Domain: Eukaryota
- Kingdom: Animalia
- Phylum: Arthropoda
- Class: Insecta
- Order: Coleoptera
- Suborder: Polyphaga
- Infraorder: Elateriformia
- Family: Elateridae
- Subfamily: Agrypninae
- Genus: Monocrepidius
- Species: M. falli

Binomial name
- Monocrepidius falli (Lane, 1956)

Synonyms
- Monocrepidius difformis Fall, 1929 (Homonym); Conoderus falli Lane, 1956; Heteroderes falli (Lane, 1956)

Species of beetle

Monocrepidius falli, the southern potato wireworm, is a species of click beetle in the family Elateridae.
