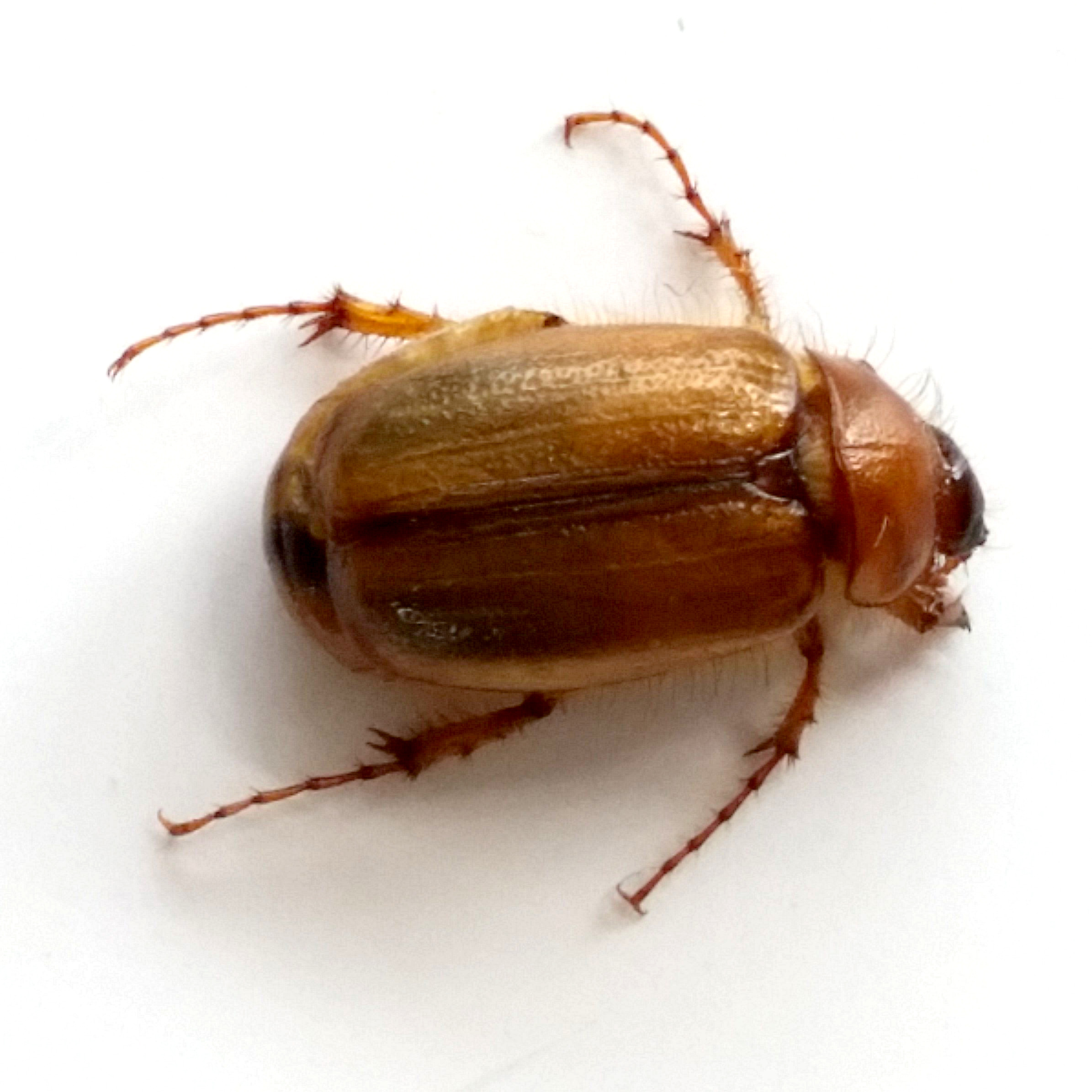
- Costelytra zealandica

Scientific classification
- Kingdom: Animalia
- Phylum: Arthropoda
- Class: Insecta
- Order: Coleoptera
- Suborder: Polyphaga
- Infraorder: Scarabaeiformia
- Family: Scarabaeidae
- Subfamily: Melolonthinae
- Genus: Costelytra; Given, 1952

= Costelytra =

Genus of beetles

Costelytra is a genus of beetles belonging to the family Scarabaeidae.

The species of this genus are found in New Zealand.

Species:

- Costelytra austrobrunneum Given, 1952
- Costelytra brookesi Given, 1966
- Costelytra brooksei Given, 1966
- Costelytra brunneum (Broun, 1880)
- Costelytra distincta Given, 1966
- Costelytra diurna Given, 1960
- Costelytra giveni Coca-Abia & Romero-Samper, 2016
- Costelytra gregoryi Given, 1966
- Costelytra macrobrunneum Given, 1952
- Costelytra piceobrunneum Given, 1952
- Costelytra pseudobrunneum Given, 1952
- Costelytra symmetrica Given, 1966
- Costelytra zealandica (White, 1846)
