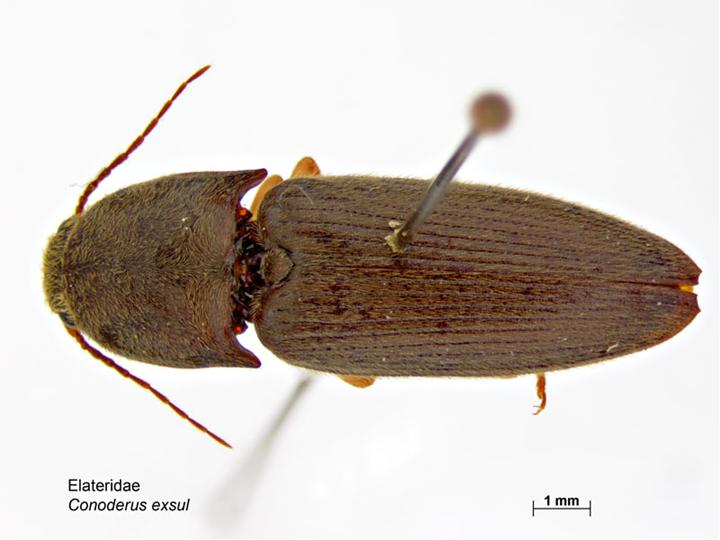

Scientific classification
- Kingdom: Animalia
- Phylum: Arthropoda
- Clade: Pancrustacea
- Class: Insecta
- Order: Coleoptera
- Suborder: Polyphaga
- Infraorder: Elateriformia
- Family: Elateridae
- Genus: Monocrepidius
- Species: M. exsul

Binomial name
- Monocrepidius exsul (Sharp, 1877)
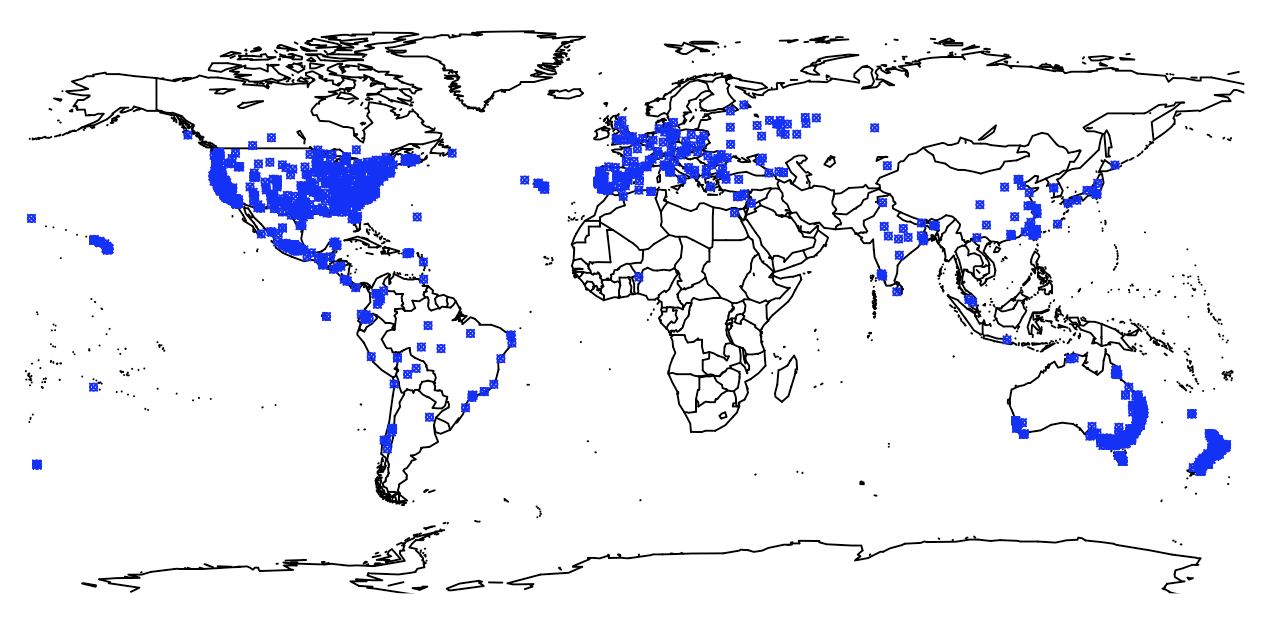
- Distribution of Monocrepidius exsul from iNaturalist (as of August 2026)

Synonyms
- Conoderus exsul (Sharp, 1877)

= Monocrepidius exsul =

Species of beetle

Monocrepidius exsul, known generally as the pasture wireworm or sugarcane wireworm, is a species of click beetle in the family Elateridae. It is native to New Zealand, Australia and Hawaii. It has been introduced to North America and to Europe, such as France and Spain.

== Description ==
Monocrepidius exsul are large click beetles with sexual size dimorphism as adults. Males are 8.5–12 mm (0.33–0.47 in) in length, while larger females are 11–13 mm (0.43–0.51 in) in length. Adults have elongated and narrow bodies with a cylindrical or flat body. They can be brown or black in colour.

The larvae of Monocrepidius exsul are white when young, however they become more cream in colour through moults. A full grown larvae can be 15–19 mm (0.59–0.75 in) long and 2.2–2.8 mm (0.087–0.110 in) wide.

Pupae are opaque white at the start, but over time begin to appear cream in colouration with dark spots. These can vary from 8–14 mm (0.31–0.55 in) in length and 2.5–3.4 mm (0.098–0.134 in) in width.

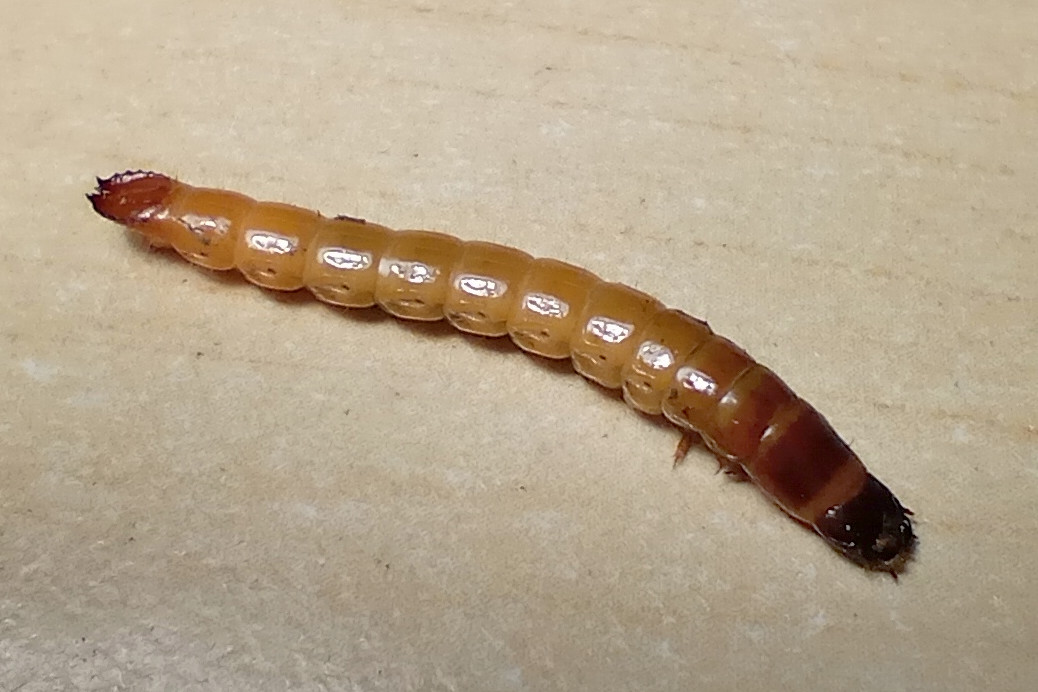
Pasture wireworm larva

== Diet ==
Monocrepidius exsul are omnivores; they feed on plants and insects. Such as wheat seeds, grass grub, and larvae of white-fringed weevil and soldier flies. In Hawaii and Australia, Monocrepidius exsul mainly eats sugar cane shoots. As larvae, they feed on grass roots.

== Lifecycle ==
Eggs are laid from June to early September. The eggs hatch into larvae, where they will remain in larval stage for 8 to 12 months. After the larval stage, there is the pupae stage, which can range from 14 to 18 days. The average adult stage length is 38 days.

== Habitat ==
Monocrepidius exsul can be found underground in open areas mainly dominated by grass. They can be found in places like grasslands and pastures. Larvae can be found within the soil.
