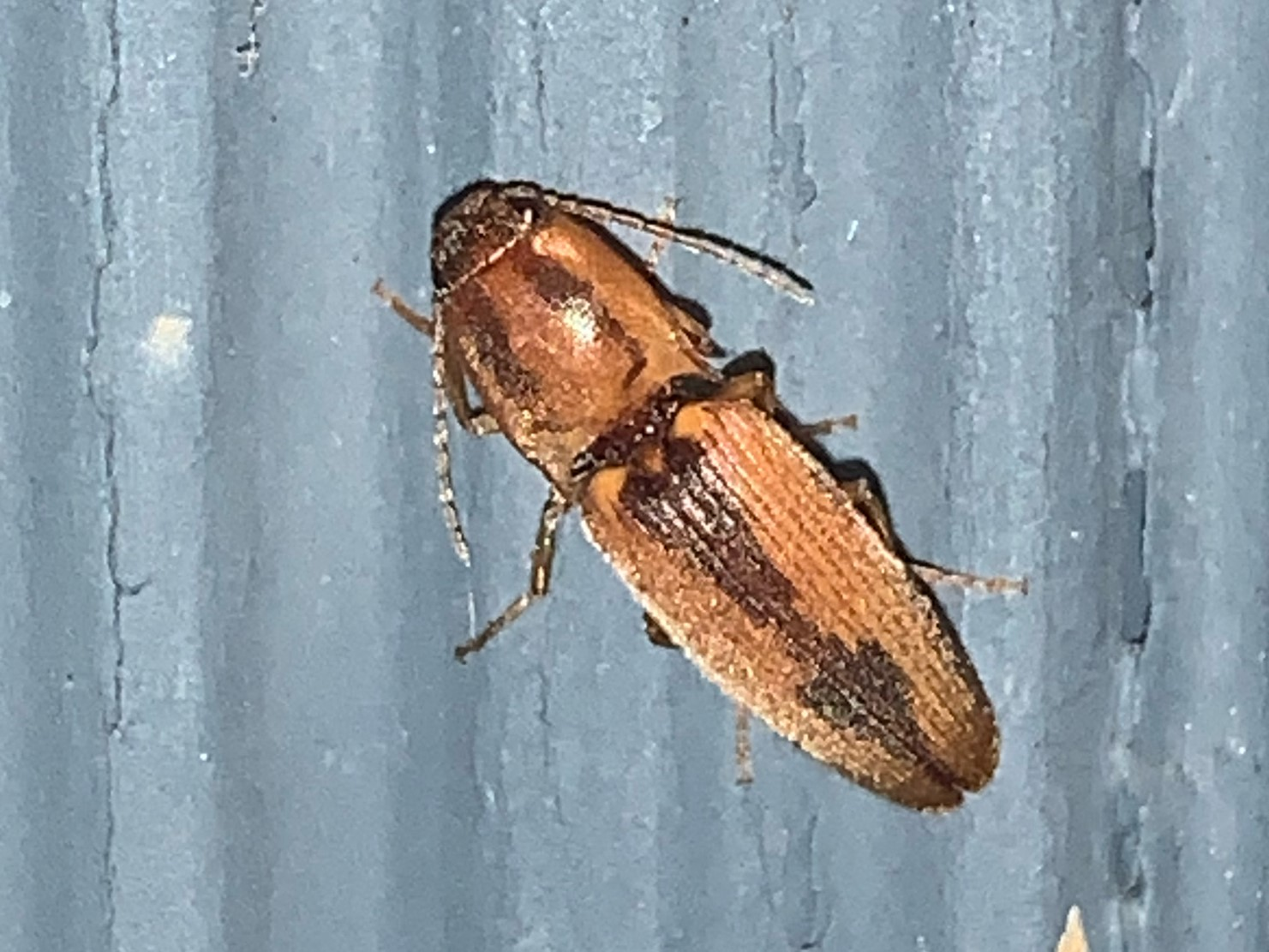

Scientific classification
- Kingdom: Animalia
- Phylum: Arthropoda
- Class: Insecta
- Order: Coleoptera
- Suborder: Polyphaga
- Infraorder: Elateriformia
- Family: Elateridae
- Genus: Monocrepidius
- Species: M. vespertinus

Binomial name
- Monocrepidius vespertinus (Fabricius, 1801)

Synonyms
- Elater vespertinus Fabricius, 1801; Conoderus vespertinus (Fabricius, 1801)

= Monocrepidius vespertinus =

Species of beetle

Monocrepidius vespertinus, the tobacco wireworm, is a species of click beetle in the family Elateridae.
