= Serratia aquatilis =

Scientific classification
- Domain: Bacteria
- Kingdom: Pseudomonadati
- Phylum: Pseudomonadota
- Class: Gammaproteobacteria
- Order: Enterobacterales
- Family: Yersiniaceae
- Genus: Serratia
- Species: S. aquatilis

Binomial name
- Serratia aquatilis Kämpfer and Glaeser 2016

Type strain
- CCM 8626, LMG 29119, 2015-2462-01

Species of bacterium

Serratia aquatilis is a Gram-negative and rod-shaped bacteria from the genus of Serratia, which has been isolated from drinking-water systems.
