= Red diaper syndrome =

Bacterial infection

Red diaper syndrome is an infection by Serratia marcescens bacteria that causes a baby's diaper as well as nursing pads and breast pumps to turn pink or red.

Absent signs of clinical infection, it is safe to continue breastfeeding.
