= Serratia entomophila =

Scientific classification
- Domain: Bacteria
- Kingdom: Pseudomonadati
- Phylum: Pseudomonadota
- Class: Gammaproteobacteria
- Order: Enterobacterales
- Family: Yersiniaceae
- Genus: Serratia
- Species: S. entomophila

Binomial name
- Serratia entomophila Grimont et al. 1988

Species of bacterium

Serratia entomophila is a species of bacteria that like its cogenerate species uses itaconate. It was first isolated from the grass grub Costelytra zealandica infected with amber disease, suggesting some involvement in the latter. Its type strain is A1^{T} (ATCC 43705^{T}).
