= Bartolomeo Bizio =

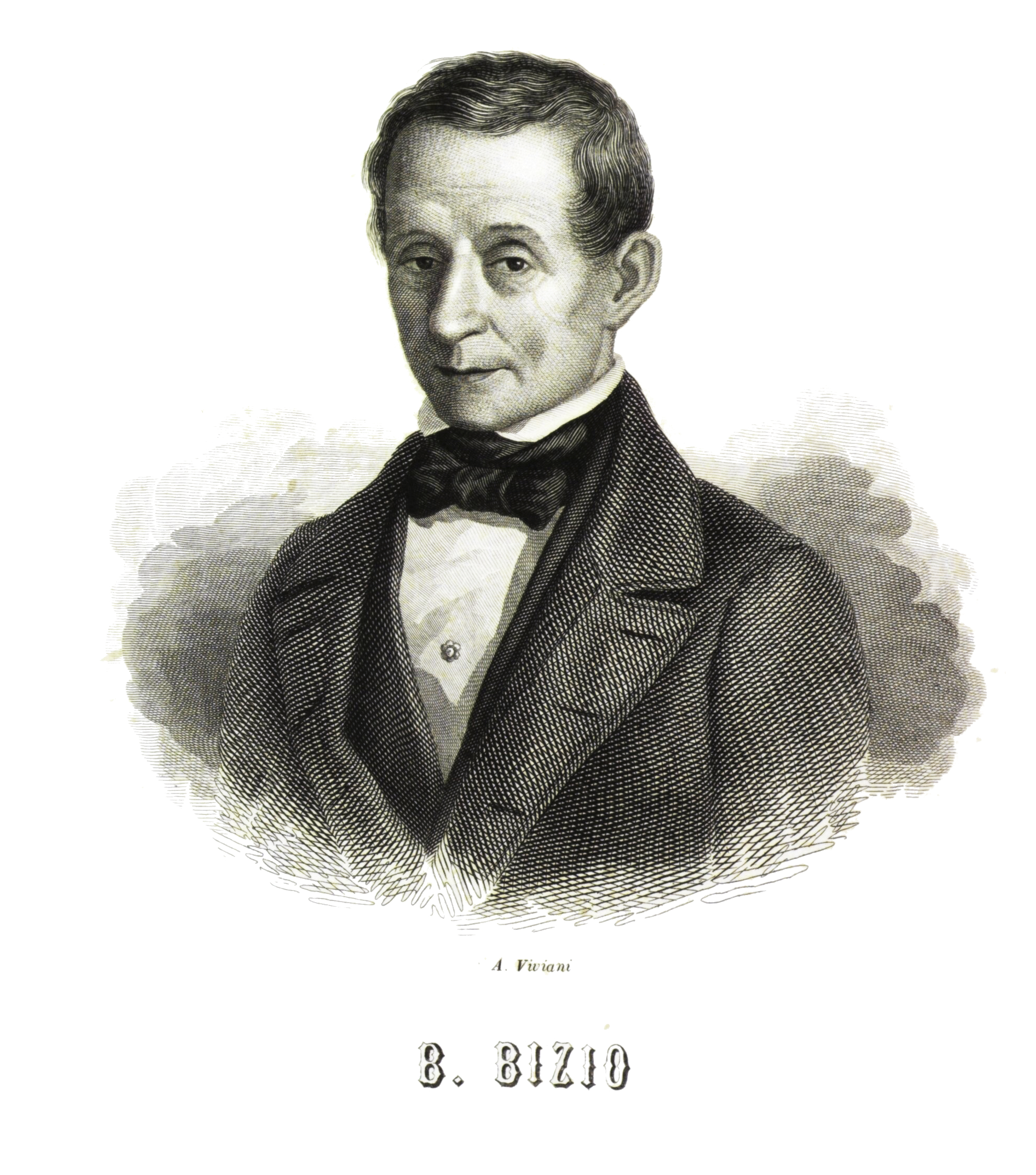

Bartolomeo Bizio (30 October 1791 - 27 September 1862) was an Italian chemist and a pioneer of microbiology who examined bloody spots on polenta and recognized them as being caused by a microorganism that he named as Serratia after the Florentine physicist Serafino Serrati.

Bizio was the son of tailor Giovanni Bizio and Paolina née Zampieroni born in Costozza di Longare, Republic of Venice. He grew up in Padua. He was educated in Padua and around 1809 he worked at the Zanichelli pharmacy. He suffered from eye strain and later became a physics teacher after meeting Abbot Cicuto. He then trained at the University to become a pharmacist in 1820. Around 1819 he examined the phenomenon of "bloody polenta", initially claimed to be a miracle, and examined the cause of the red spots on corn meal and other starchy foods. He identified the cause as being an organism. He investigated dispersal of the microscopic organism by direct contact and by airborne transmission (albeit at very short distances) by showing that red spots appeared on a piece of polenta kept in a warm and moist place. He noted that the red pigment quickly faded and so gave it the species name marcescens meaning "to decay" in Latin. Bizio published his results in the local Gazzetta privilegiata and also wrote about his studies to Angelo Bellani.

Bizio later examined the purple colour of Murex trunculus and Murex brandaris and identified that they were secreted by a gland and that the liquid became purple after coming in contact with air. He also examined the chemical composition of the molluscs and determined that they contained significant amounts of copper. He came up with ideas on chemical reactions based on analogies with gravitational force.
