= Serratia proteamaculans =

Scientific classification
- Domain: Bacteria
- Kingdom: Pseudomonadati
- Phylum: Pseudomonadota
- Class: Gammaproteobacteria
- Order: Enterobacterales
- Family: Yersiniaceae
- Genus: Serratia
- Species: S. proteamaculans

Binomial name
- Serratia proteamaculans (Paine and Stansfield 1919); Grimont et al. 1978

Synonyms
- Pseudomonas proteamaculans Paine and Stansfield 1919; Xantomonas proteamaculans (Paine and Stansfield 1919) Burkholder 1948; Erwinia proteamaculans (Paine and Stansfield 1919) Dye 1966

Species of bacterium

Serratia proteamaculans is a Gram-negative, facultatively anaerobic, rod-shaped bacterium. S. proteamaculans HY-3 isolated from the digestive tract of a spider produces an extracellular protease named arazyme, with an estimated molecular mass of 51.5 kDa.
