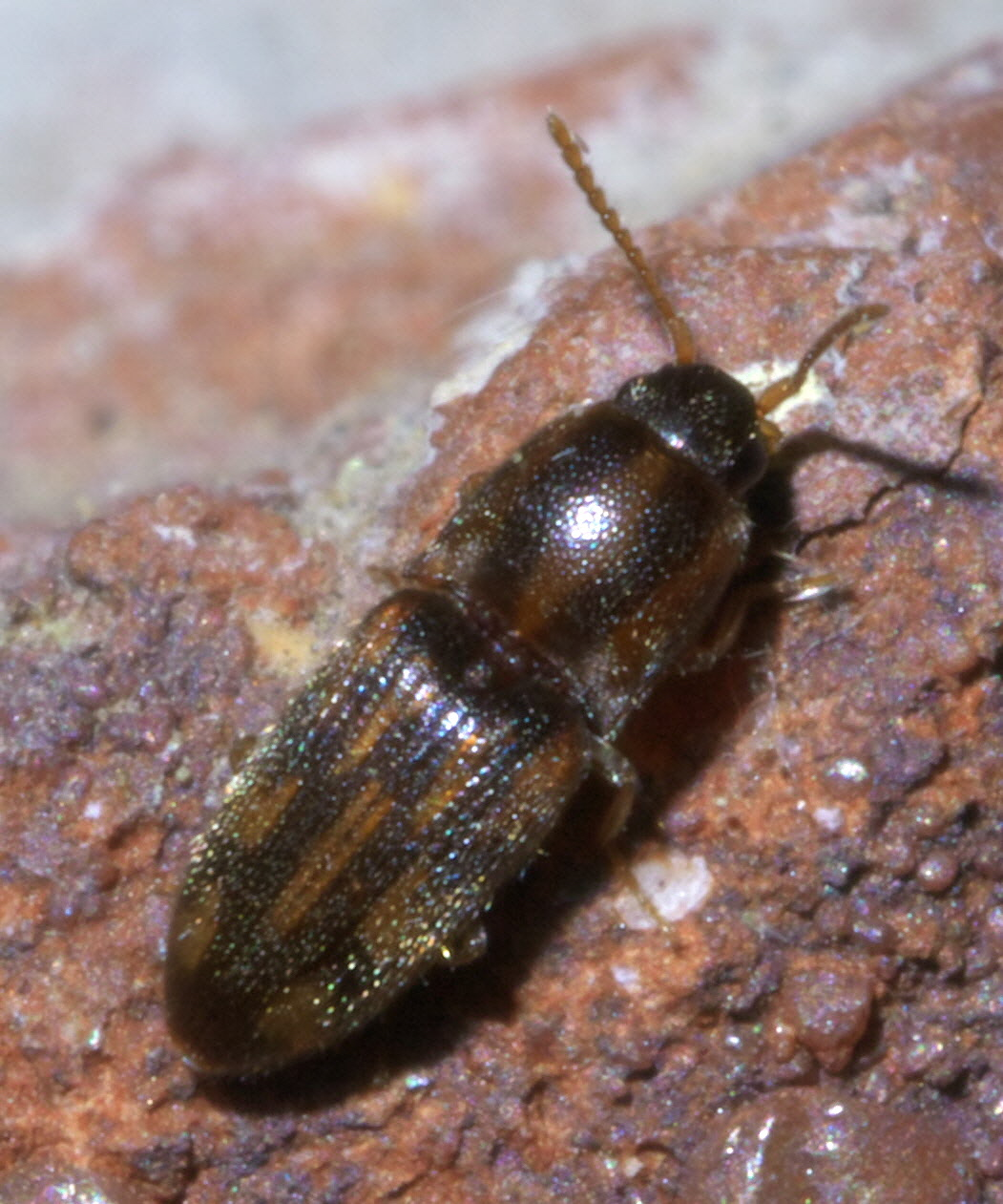
- Monocrepidius bellus

Scientific classification
- Domain: Eukaryota
- Kingdom: Animalia
- Phylum: Arthropoda
- Class: Insecta
- Order: Coleoptera
- Suborder: Polyphaga
- Infraorder: Elateriformia
- Family: Elateridae
- Subfamily: Agrypninae
- Tribe: Oophorini
- Genus: Monocrepidius; Eschscholtz, 1829

Synonyms
- Conoderus Eschscholtz, 1829; Silene Broun, 1893

= Monocrepidius =

Genus of beetles

Monocrepidius is a genus of click beetles in the family Elateridae. The genus has often been cited as Conoderus, but of the two names for this genus published simultaneously in 1829, the one selected by the First Reviser under the ICZN was Monocrepidius, rendering Conoderus the junior synonym.

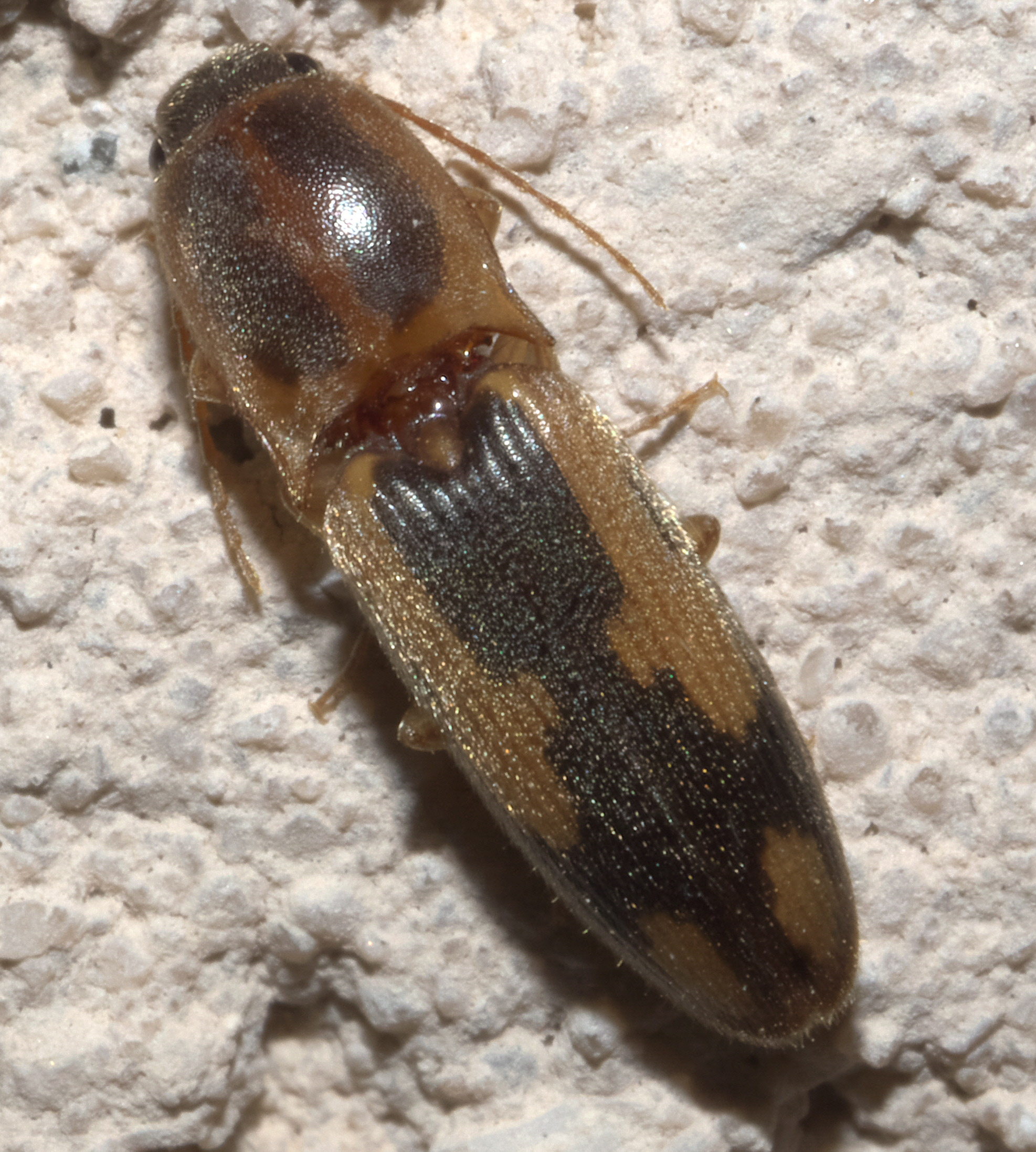
Monocrepidius vespertinus

== Selected species ==
- Monocrepidius athoides LeConte, 1863
- Monocrepidius auritus (Herbst, 1806)
- Monocrepidius aversus LeConte, 1853
- Monocrepidius bellus (Say, 1823)
- Monocrepidius belti (Champion, 1895)
- Monocrepidius bifoveatus (Palisot de Beauvois, 1805)
- Monocrepidius browni (Knull, 1938)
- Monocrepidius cairnsensis (Blackburn, 1893)
- Monocrepidius castaneus (Fabricius, 1792)
- Monocrepidius concretus (Candèze, 1881)
- Monocrepidius delauneyi (Fleutiaux, 1911)
- Monocrepidius delicatus (Fall, 1929)
- Monocrepidius elegans (Candèze, 1878)
- Monocrepidius exsul (Sharp, 1877) (pasture wireworm)
- Monocrepidius falli (Lane, 1956) (southern potato wireworm)
- Monocrepidius ferruginosus (Fall, 1929)
- Monocrepidius lenis (Candèze, 1881)
- Monocrepidius leucophaeatus (Candèze, 1859)
- Monocrepidius lividus (De Geer, 1774)
- Monocrepidius nigricollis (Fleutiaux, 1918)
- Monocrepidius pallipes (Eschscholtz, 1829)
- Monocrepidius parallelus (Candèze, 1859)
- Monocrepidius pictus (Candèze, 1859)
- Monocrepidius poirieri (Chassain, Deknuydt & Romé, 2014)
- Monocrepidius posticus (Eschscholtz, 1822)
- Monocrepidius rudis (Brown, 1933)
- Monocrepidius rufidens (Fabricius, 1801)
- Monocrepidius scissus Schaeffer, 1909
- Monocrepidius sericeus (Candèze, 1865)
- Monocrepidius similis Schaeffer, 1909
- Monocrepidius suturalis LeConte, 1853
- Monocrepidius vespertinus (Fabricius, 1801) (tobacco wireworm)
- Monocrepidius vitraci (Fleutiaux, 1911)
- Monocrepidius xysticus (Candèze, 1859)
