= Serafino Serrati =

Benedictine monk and scientist

Serafino Serrati was an 18th-century Italian Benedictine monk who practiced or taught physical sciences. He appears to have lived in the Badia Fiorentina (Florentine Abbey of monks of the order of Monte Cassino). He is now best remembered because the bacterial genus for a specific gram-negative rod-shaped bacterium called Serratia is named after him in 1819 by the botanist and chemist Bartolomeo Bizio (1791 – 1862) to honour him for his unrecognized invention of a steamboat.

== Biography ==
Information regarding Serafino is limited. Born in the 18th century in Florence to a respectable family, he appears to have studied physics and botany. He is thought to have been the professor of experimental physics in his monastery.

Among his preferred studies was to find ways to direct the movement of globi areostatici, today in English referred to as hot-air balloons. It is said that his fellow monks Rabatta and Serrati were the first Florentines to become air-bound by globes. In addition, according to a biographer, he was the first to apply the force of the vapour in lumber to move in the sea An article by Jouffroy d'Ambrans reported on his barchetto a fuoco (ship on fire).

He was said to have been adept and diligent in his monastic responsibility. One anecdote is that once, upon hearing the bells calling the monks to choir as part of the liturgy of the hours, Serrafino would rush over still wearing the apron he was using while at work at some chemical oven. The editor of his letters remarks on his modesty and humility, and dismissal of world fame.

Among his reports published in life are the following nine communications:

- Regarding observations in the choice of flammable air
- Describing a two-burner retort to decompose wine spirit into flammable air
- Which describes a model to form an aerostatic globe with a conical shape, without making seams that it does not lose the air that is introduced into it
- Which explains the guiding of an aerostatic globe [balloon] in any direction, and to any height
- Representation of a flush scale, without friction
- About a pneumatic machine powered by mercury
- Description of a positive and negative conductor, and of an electrophore without resins
- Description of a boat powered by fire, which with that force, moves without wind(power)
- Describing a reverberating oven, for the use of baking bread.

== Observations ==
The obscurity of the scientific efforts of Serafino recall the obscurity of Gregor Mendel's observations in the next century. However, Serafino could be considered only one more addition to the long list of Catholic clergy scientists.

== Bibliography ==
- All the above bibliographical entries were derived solely from:
- Dizionario biografico universale, Volume 5, by Felice Scifoni, Publisher Davide Passagli, Florence (1849); page 38.
