= Serralysin =

Enzyme

Identifiers
- EC no.: 3.4.24.40
- CAS no.: 70851-98-8

Databases
- IntEnz: IntEnz view
- BRENDA: BRENDA entry
- ExPASy: NiceZyme view
- KEGG: KEGG entry
- MetaCyc: metabolic pathway
- PRIAM: profile
- PDB structures: RCSB PDB PDBe PDBsum
Search
- PMC: articles
- PubMed: articles
- NCBI: proteins

Serralysin (EC 3.4.24.40, Pseudomonas aeruginosa alkaline proteinase, Escherichia freundii proteinase, Serratia marcescens extracellular proteinase, Serratia marcescens metalloproteinase, Pseudomonas aeruginosa alk. protease, Serratia marcescens metalloprotease) is an enzyme. This enzyme catalyses the following chemical reaction

Preferential cleavage of bonds with hydrophobic residues in P1'

This extracellular endopeptidase is present in Pseudomonas aeruginosa, Escherichia freundii, Serratia marcescens and Erwinia chrysanthemi.
