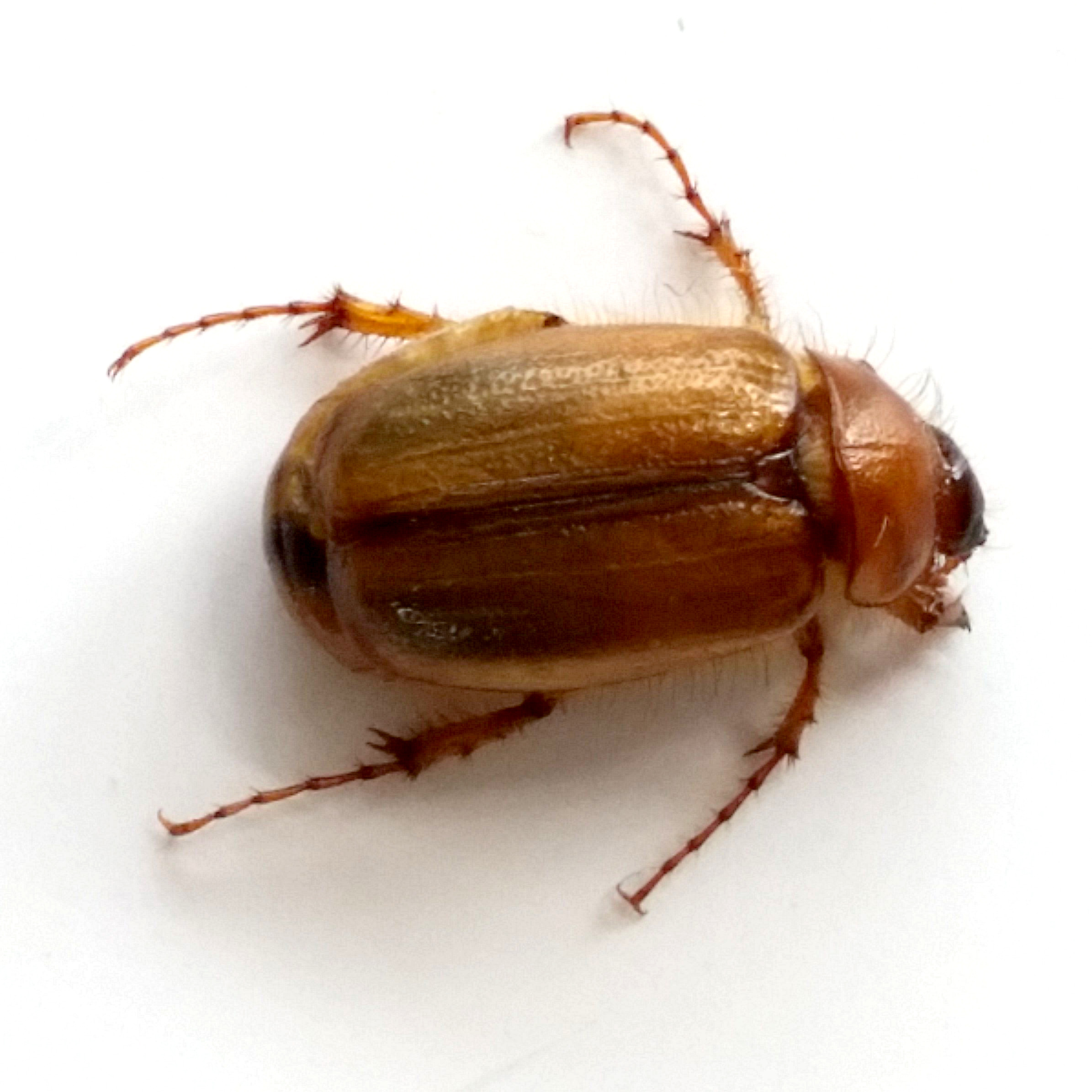

Scientific classification
- Kingdom: Animalia
- Phylum: Arthropoda
- Class: Insecta
- Order: Coleoptera
- Suborder: Polyphaga
- Infraorder: Scarabaeiformia
- Family: Scarabaeidae
- Genus: Costelytra
- Species: C. zealandica

Binomial name
- Costelytra zealandica (White, 1846)

Synonyms
- Rhisotrogus zealandica White, 1846

= Costelytra zealandica =

Species of beetle

Costelytra zealandica (commonly known as the grass grub) is a species of scarab beetle found in forested areas of greater Wellington. It was originally described in 1846 by the British entomologist Adam White as Rhisotrogus zealandicus from a specimen obtained during the Ross expedition. The species is known to feed on roots of plants and trees, so is considered a pest for many farm pastures.

Prior to 2016, the New Zealand grass grub was mischaracterized as C. zealandica. In 2016 Coca-Abia and Romero-Samper found differences in syntype specimens between White's (1846) C. zealandica and Given's (1952) description and revised the species name of the latter to Costelytra giveni after Given.
