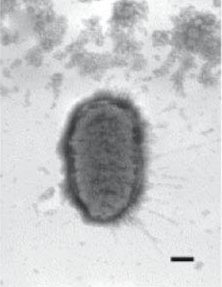
- Electron micrograph of Proteus penneri. Bar represents 200nm.

Scientific classification
- Domain: Bacteria
- Kingdom: Pseudomonadati
- Phylum: Pseudomonadota
- Class: Gammaproteobacteria
- Order: Enterobacterales
- Family: Enterobacteriaceae
- Genus: Proteus
- Species: P. penneri

Binomial name
- Proteus penneri Hickman et al. 1982

= Proteus penneri =

Species of bacterium

Proteus penneri is a Gram-negative, facultatively anaerobic, rod-shaped bacterium. It is an invasive pathogen and a cause of nosocomial infections of the urinary tract or open wounds. Pathogens have been isolated mainly from the urine of patients with abnormalities in the urinary tract, and from stool. P. penneri strains are naturally resistant to numerous antibiotics, including penicillin G, amoxicillin, cephalosporins, oxacillin, and most macrolides, but are naturally sensitive to aminoglycosides, carbapenems, aztreonam, quinolones, sulphamethoxazole, and co-trimoxazole. Isolates of P. penneri have been found to be multiple drug-resistant (MDR) with resistance to six to eight drugs. β-lactamase production has also been identified in some isolates.

== History ==
The Proteus penneri group of bacteria was named in 1982. It reclassified a group of strains formerly known as Proteus vulgaris biogroup 1. In 1978, Brenner et al. showed through DNA hybridization studies that P. vulgaris was a heterogenous species. In 1981, Hickman et al conducted experiments on 20 indole-negative strains previously grouped with P.vulgaris and demonstrated the existence of three P. vulgaris biogroups. P. vulgaris biogroup 1, or indole-negative P. vulgaris, was distinguished as a new species within the genus Proteus in 1982. The new species was named Proteus penneri in honor of John Penner, a Canadian microbiologist.

== Lab identification and differentiation ==
Extended biochemical tests have characterized P. penneri as being uniformly salicin negative. The inability to produce ornithine decarboxylase differentiates P. penneri from another indole-negative Proteus species, P.mirabilis. P. penneri isolates are not fermenters of salicin and not users of citrate, but acidify sucrose and maltose. Other chief characteristics of this species that enable its differentiation from other Proteus species include failure to acidify esculin, failure to produce hydrogen sulfide on triple sugar iron agar, and resistance to chloramphenicol. The resistance of P. penneri to cefuroxime and the marked inhibitory activity of cefoxitin against this species also distinguishes P. penneri from the other Proteus. Similar to other Proteus species, P. penneri has a cell-bound hemolytic factor, which has been shown to facilitate penetration of the organism into cultured Vero cells without any cytotoxic effects. It also has a filterable cytotoxic alpha-hemolysin rarely found in other Proteus species. A highly active urease produced by P. penneri may also have a role in the establishment of an infectious process.

The application of molecular techniques such as the polymerase chain reaction to produce DNA fingerprints and other 16S ribosomal RNA gene (ribotyping) methods of strain analysis have been employed to differentiate P. penneri from P. vulgaris and P. mirabilis strains. The RAPD technique, fundamentally a DNA fingerprinting method, has exposed a substantial DNA diversity among P. penneri strains, a characteristic that remained unidentified by other methods.

Distinguishing biochemical features of Proteus penneri.
Test	Result
Microscopic morphology	Gram-negative rods
Hemolysis (sheep blood agar)	Beta
Urease	Positive
Indole production	Negative
Esculin hydrolysis	Negative
Acid from Maltose	Positive
Acid from Sucrose	Positive
Citrate use	Negative
Ornithine decarboxylase	Negative
Hydrogen sulfide production	Positive

=== Subtypes ===
The lipopolysaccharide (LPS) core region of P. penneri strains contains higher structural variability than that observed in other representatives of Enterobacterales. These differences have been used to cluster P. penneri strains into serogroups based on their agglutinating activity when mixed with antibodies directed against specific species of LPS molecules. Presently, 15 O-serogroups have been proposed for P. penneri based on the chemical structure of the O-specific polysaccharide chain (O-antigen) of the lipopolysaccharide. Certain LPS epitopes have been examined to determine their function in antigenic specificity. The particular groups on the oligosaccharides found to play a dominant role in the specificity of P. penneri LPS are the amide of D-galacturonic acid with L-lysine α-D-GalA-(L-Lys) (and the amide of D-galacturonic acid with L-threonine α-D-GalA- [L-Thr]), respectively.

=== Isolation ===
The occurrence of P. penneri organisms in the normal intestine accounts for their higher frequency in urinary tract infections and for their role as opportunistic invaders after surgery. P. penneri is absent from the intestines of livestock. The optimum growth condition for P. penneri is achieved at 37 °C, which mirrors the intestinal niche colonized by many of these bacteria. Certain strains of P. penneri can differentiate into elongated hyperflagelled cells during development on solid media, resulting in the surface translocation event identified as “swarming”. Swarming motility makes it difficult to isolate single colonies for further study.

== Incidence and epidemiology ==
The proportion of P. penneri strains isolated in clinical specimens is unknown. Since P. penneri was only recently recognized as a new species, many bacteriologists are either generally unaware of it, or have made limited attempts to discover its clinical significance. Thus, reports on the isolation of P. penneri from infected patients is limited. Although increasing numbers of laboratories are now identifying P.penneri strains, the numbers reported in susceptibility studies are relatively small for a general assessment of the incidence of the species. Likewise, the epidemiology of P.penneri is also unknown for these reasons.

== Clinical significance ==
Documented human clinical infections caused by P. penneri have been limited to the urinary tract and to wounds of the abdomen, groin, neck, and ankle. This species is isolated from individuals in long-term care facilities and hospitals and from patients who are immunocompromised or suffering from underlying disease. P. penneri was isolated significantly more often from stools of patients with diarrheal disease than from healthy patients, so P. penneri may play a role in some diarrheal disease. The invasive potential of this microorganism has also been demonstrated in a case of P. penneri bacteremia and concomitant subcutaneous thigh abscess in a neutropenic patient with acute lymphocytic leukemia and in nosocomial urosepsis in a diabetic patient from whom the organism was also subsequently isolated from bronchoalveolar lavage fluid and a pulmonary catheter tip. Furthermore, in an experiment conducted in India, P. penneri strains were isolated as the sole pathogen in all patients having underlying disease postoperatively. Most isolates of P. penneri from the experiment were found to be multiple drug-resistant including resistance to amoxy-clavulanic acid combination. In another study, P. penneri was found to be more resistant to the penicillins and cephalosporins than P. mirabilis and mostly in patients with urogenital infections. Moreover, the urease enzyme of P. penneri is thought to be a significant cause of kidney stone formation. Consistent with this belief, the organism has been isolated from the center of a stone removed from a patient with persistent P. penneri bacteriuria. These data substantiate the need for species-level identification of P. penneri in the clinical setting.

Several virulence factors of P. penneri can make infections from this invasive pathogen more pronounced, persistent, and harder to eradicate. These include adherence due to the presence of fimbriae or afimbrial adhesins, invasiveness, swarming phenomenon, hemolytic activity, urea hydrolysis, proteolysis, and endotoxicity. Swarming motility is the coordinated translocation of a bacterial population driven by flagellar rotation in film or on fluid surfaces. An emerging concept in microbiology, the fundamental role of swarming motility remains unknown. However, it has been observed to be correlated with an elevated resistance to certain antibiotics. Production of IgA proteolytic enzymes has also been reported in P. penneri. Secretory immunoglobulins of the IgA class are produced by mucous tissue and are particularly resistant to enzymatic breakdown by proteases. The ability to degrade a host's secretory IgA may provide P. penneri with an advantage by permitting it to evade the host immune response, therefore gaining valuable time for the bacterium to establish a foothold for infection. However, the major mechanism of antimicrobial resistance is caused by hyperproduction of the chromosomally encoded β-lactamase, sometimes by plasmids. These inducible β-lactamases hydrolyze primary and extended-spectrum penicillins and cephalosporins, thus making P. penneri strains naturally resistant to penicillin G, amoxicillin, cephalosporins (i.e. cefaclor, cefazoline, cefuroxime, and cefdinir), oxacillin, and most macrolides.

== Susceptibility profile ==
Most isolated P. penneri strains are multiple-drug resistant, with 12 being the highest drug-resistance number reported. P. penneri has a distinguishing susceptibility profile, based on the production of the chromosomally induced β-lactamase HugA. HugA determines resistance to aminopenicillins and first- and second-generation cephalosporins, including cefuroxime. However, HugA does not affect cephamycins or carbapenems and is inhibited by clavulanic acid. Similar to other Proteus species, P. penneri is resistant to tetracyclines and nitrofurantoin.

Presently, all tested strains of P. penneri have been found to be highly susceptible to:

- ceftizoxime
- ceftazidime
- moxalactam
- cefoxitin
- gentamicin
- tobramycin
- netilmicin

Most strains with a few exceptions are also susceptible to:

- amikacin
- piperacillin
- cefoperazone

All tested strains have been found resistant to:

- penicillin
- ampicillin
- tetracycline
- chloramphenicol
- co-trimoxazole

== Treatment ==
Information on the treatment of P. penneri infections is limited, but the use of gentamicin, tobramycin, netilmicin, and amikacin have been indicated as possible drugs of choice for the treatment of systemic infections caused by susceptible P. penneri strains. In vitro studies of ceftizoxime, ceftazidime, moxalactam, and cefoxitin suggest these agents also may prove to be clinically useful in treating infections caused by P. penneri.

== See also ==
- Proteus vulgaris
