= Colonial morphology =

Examination of microbial colonies

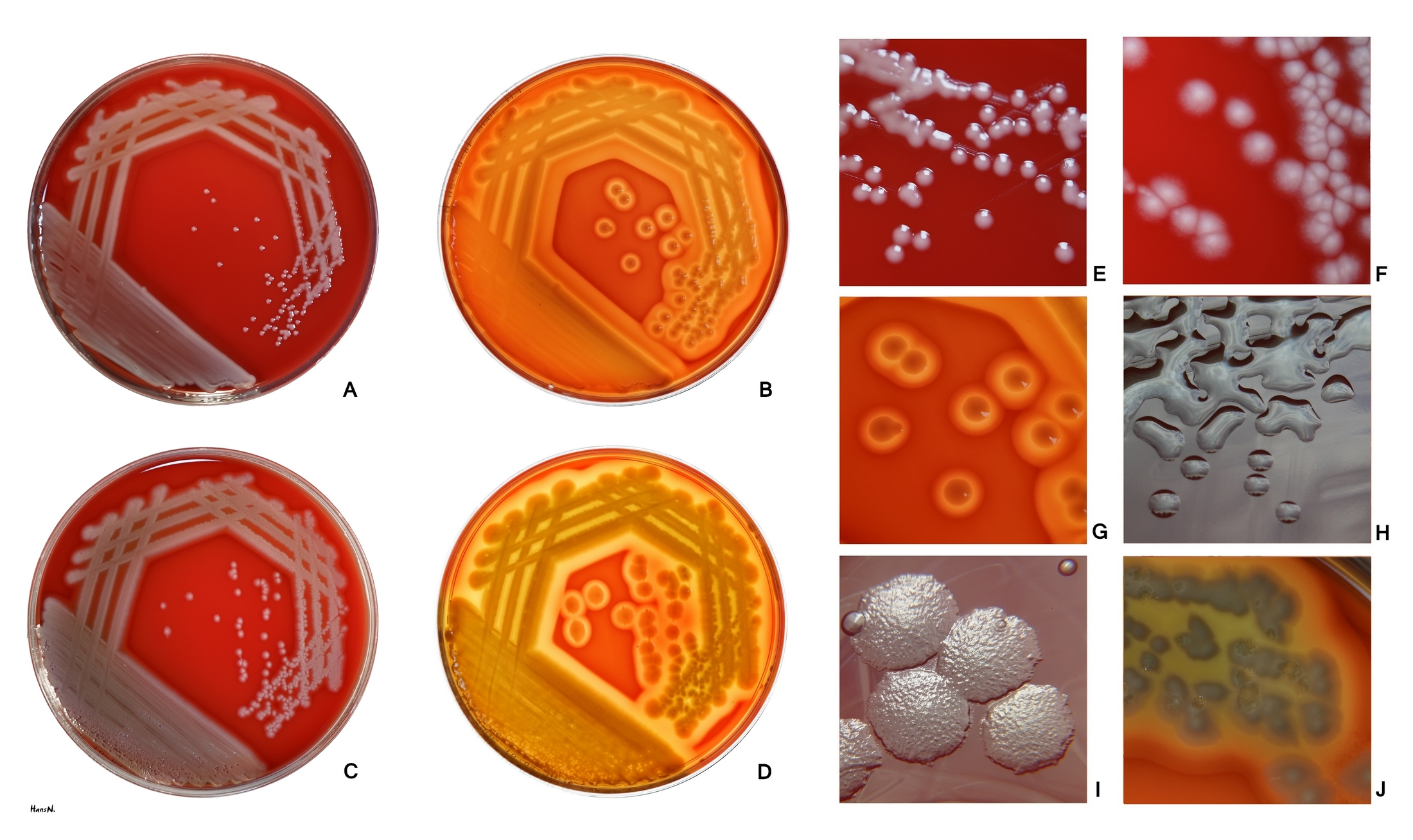
Colonial morphology of various specimens of Pseudomonas aeruginosa, including mucoid types

In microbiology, colonial morphology refers to the visual appearance of bacterial or fungal colonies on an agar plate. Examining colonial morphology is the first step in the identification of an unknown microbe. The systematic assessment of the colonies' appearance, focusing on aspects like size, shape, colour, opacity, and consistency, provides clues to the identity of the organism, allowing microbiologists to select appropriate tests to provide a definitive identification.

== Procedure ==
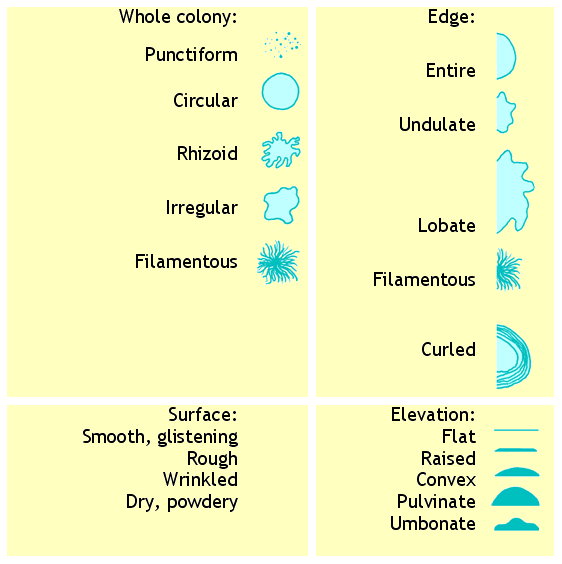
Some terms used to describe colonial morphology

When a specimen arrives in the microbiology laboratory, it is inoculated into an agar plate and placed in an incubator to encourage microbial growth. Because the appearance of microbial colonies changes as they grow, colonial morphology is examined at a specific time after the plate is inoculated. Usually, the plate is read at 18–24 hours post-inoculation, but times may differ for slower-growing organisms like fungi. The microbiologist examines the appearance of the colony, noting specific features such as size, colour, shape, consistency, and opacity. A hand lens or magnifying glass may be used to view colonies in greater detail.

The opacity of a microbial colony can be described as transparent, translucent, or opaque. Staphylococci are usually opaque, while many Streptococcus species are translucent. The overall shape of the colony may be characterized as circular, irregular, or punctiform (like pinpoints). The vertical growth or elevation of the colony, another identifying characteristic, is assessed by tilting the agar plate to the side and is denoted as flat, raised, convex, pulvinate (very convex), umbilicate (having a depression in the centre) or umbonate (having a bump in the centre). The edge of the colony may be separately described using terms like smooth, rough, irregular and filamentous. Bacillus anthracis is notable for its filamentous appearance, which is sometimes described as resembling Medusa's head.

Consistency is examined by physically manipulating the colony with a sterile instrument. It is described using terms like brittle, creamy, sticky and dry. Staphylococci are considered to have a creamy consistency, while some Neisseria species are sticky, and colonies of diphtheroid bacteria and beta-hemolytic streptococci are typically dry. Bacteria that produce capsules often have a slimy (mucoid) consistency.

When certain microorganisms are grown on blood agar, they may digest the blood in the medium, causing visible hemolysis (destruction of red blood cells) on the agar plate. In colonial morphology, hemolysis is classified into three types: alpha-, beta-, and gamma-hemolysis. In alpha-hemolysis, the blood is partially digested, causing the area around the colony to turn green. In beta-hemolysis, the organism digests the blood completely, leaving a clear area around each colony. Organisms that do not produce hemolysis are referred to as gamma-hemolytic. Clostridium perfringens, which causes gas gangrene, is noteworthy for producing a "double zone" of both complete and incomplete hemolysis.

The odour of a culture is sometimes considered part of colonial morphology. While intentionally smelling microbial cultures is not advised, some organisms produce distinctive odours that can be detected during routine examination of the culture. Among these are Pseudomonas aeruginosa, which has a grape-like scent; Staphylococcus aureus, which is said to smell like old socks; and Proteus mirabilis, whose scent is alternately described as putrid or like chocolate cake.

Other distinctive features of colonial morphology include motility and the production of pigments. Pseudomonas aeruginosa produces the pigments pyocyanin and pyoverdin, which give the colonies a greenish sheen. Some specimens of Serratia marcescens produce an orange-red pigment called prodigiosin. Organisms with swarming motility, like Proteus species, exhibit concentric waves of growth extending from the inoculation point.

Colonial morphology of selected organisms
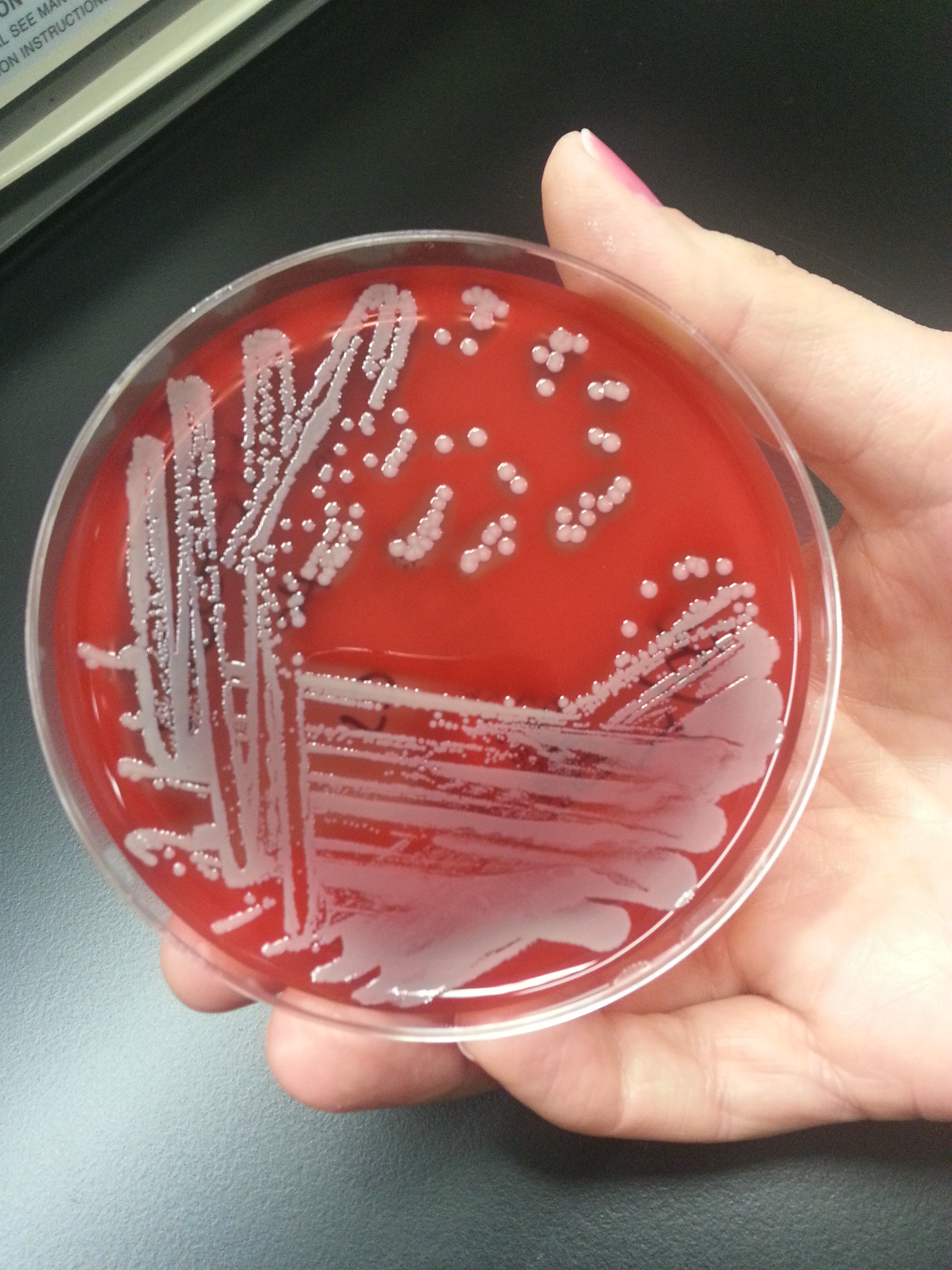
Staphylococcus aureus: large opaque, round, creamy, white to yellowish colonies displaying beta-hemolysis on blood agar

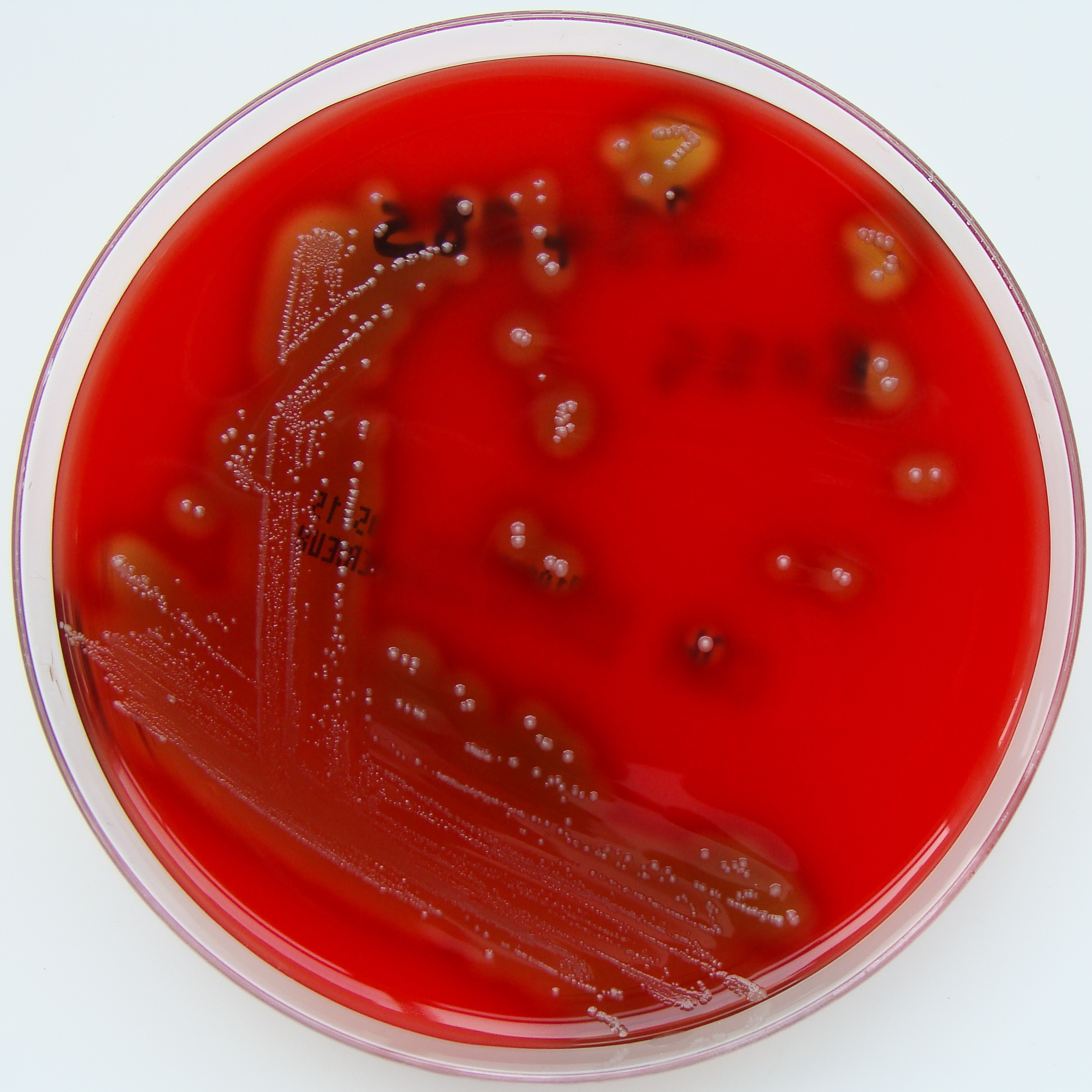
Streptococcus pyogenes: small translucent colonies displaying beta-hemolysis on blood agar

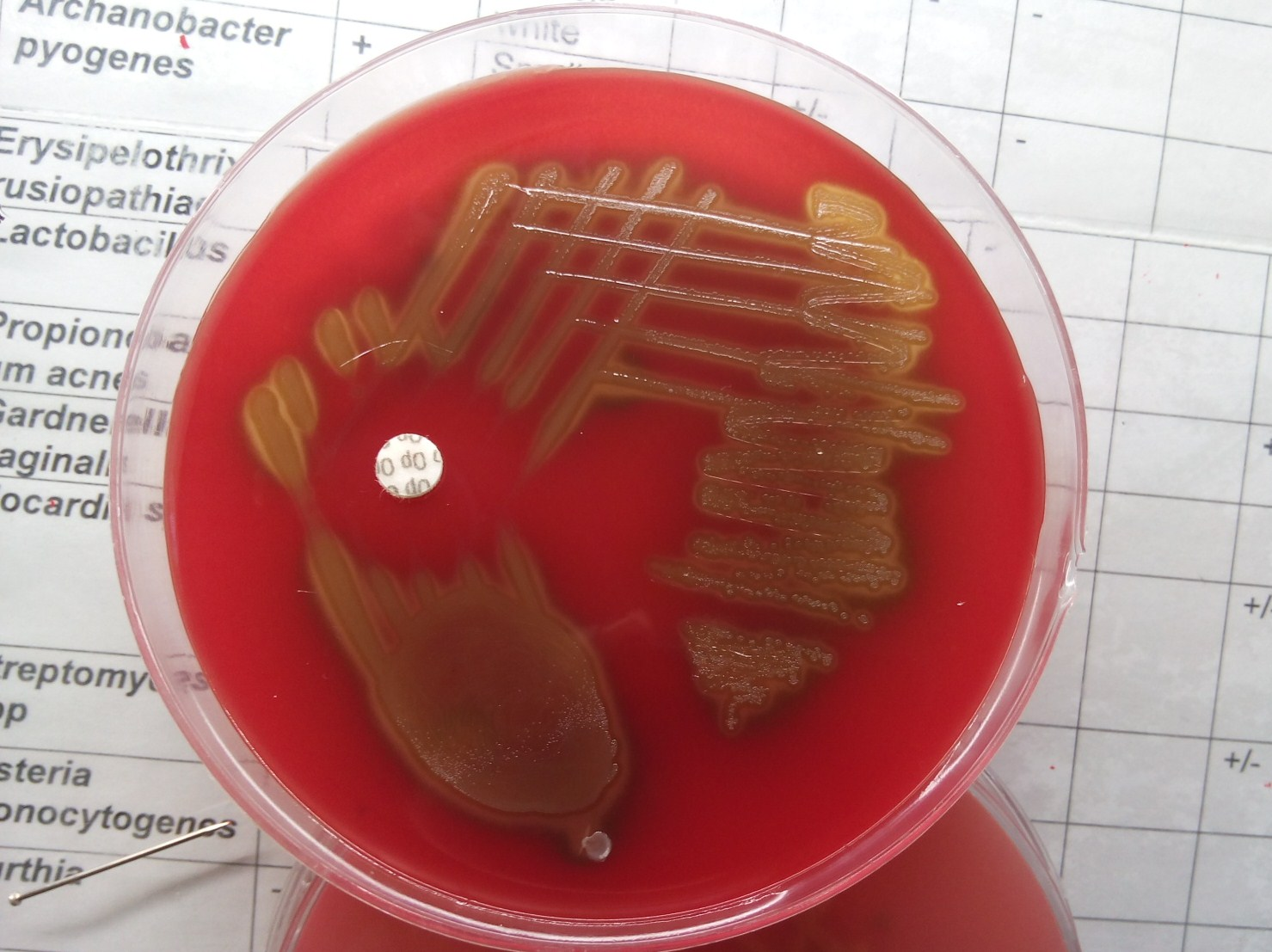
Streptococcus pneumoniae: small colonies with raised edges displaying alpha-hemolysis on blood agar

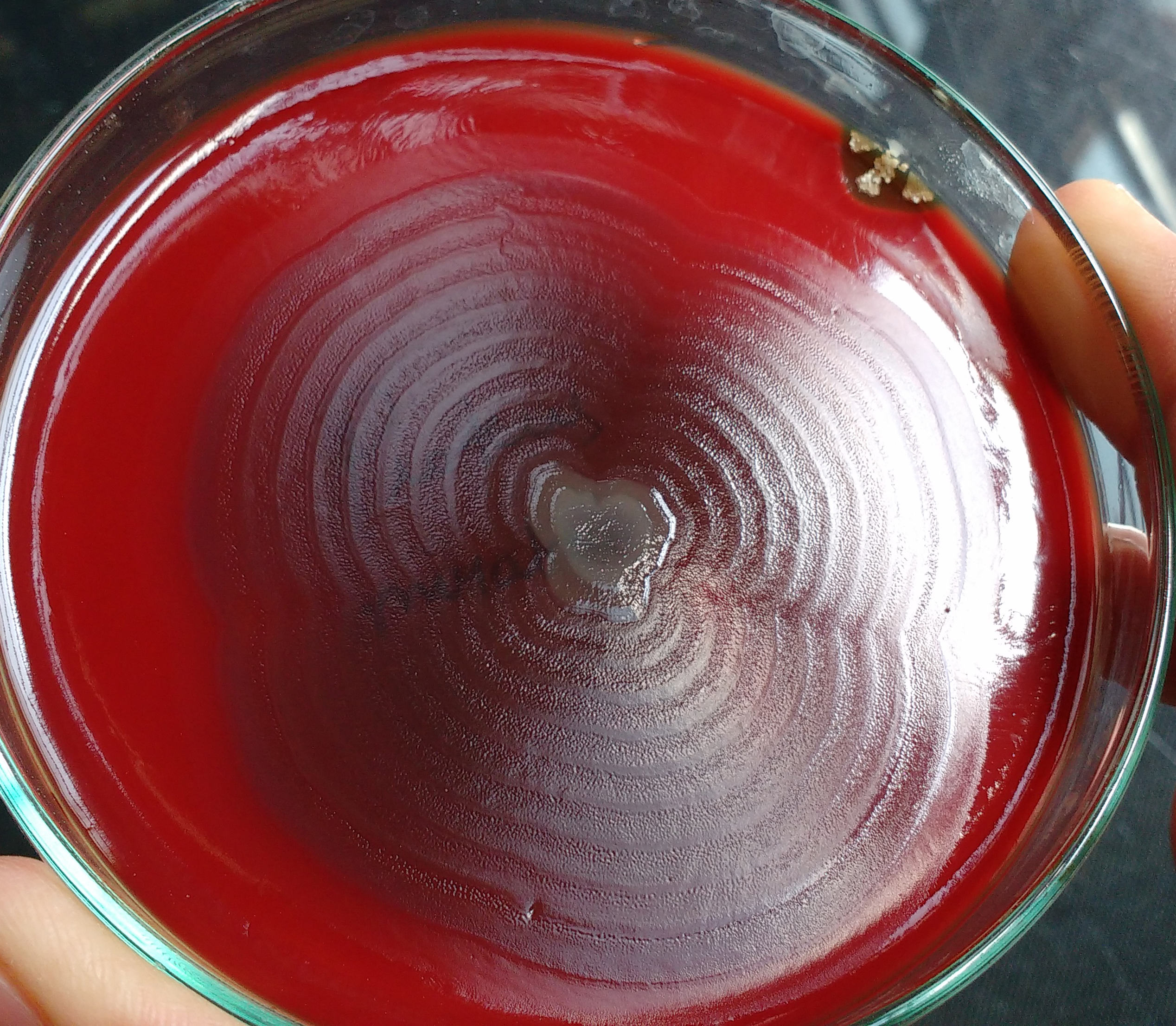
Proteus sp.: swarming behaviour on blood agar

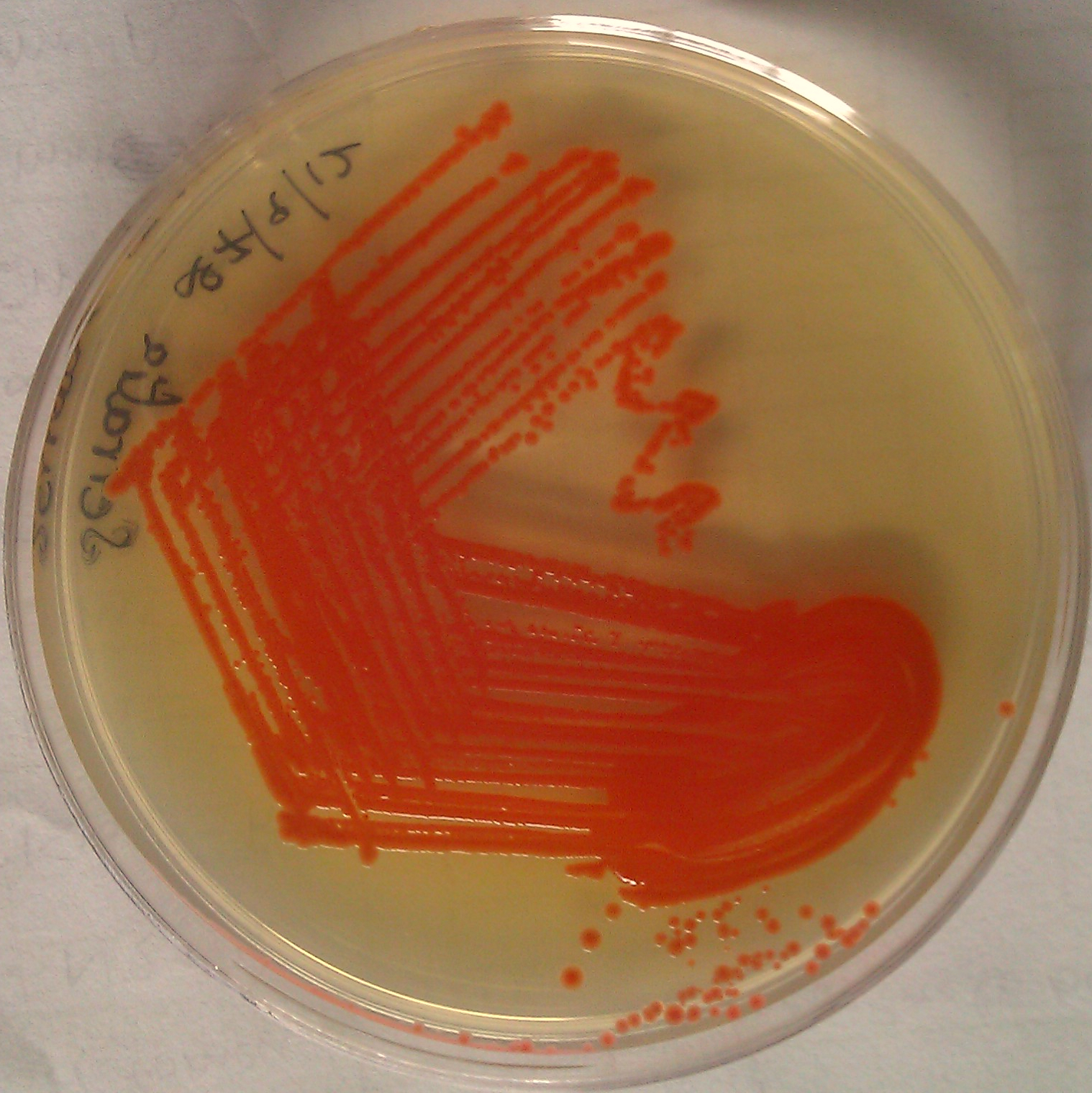
Serratia marcescens: red pigmentation: although considered characteristic of the species, only about 10% of specimens produce this pigment

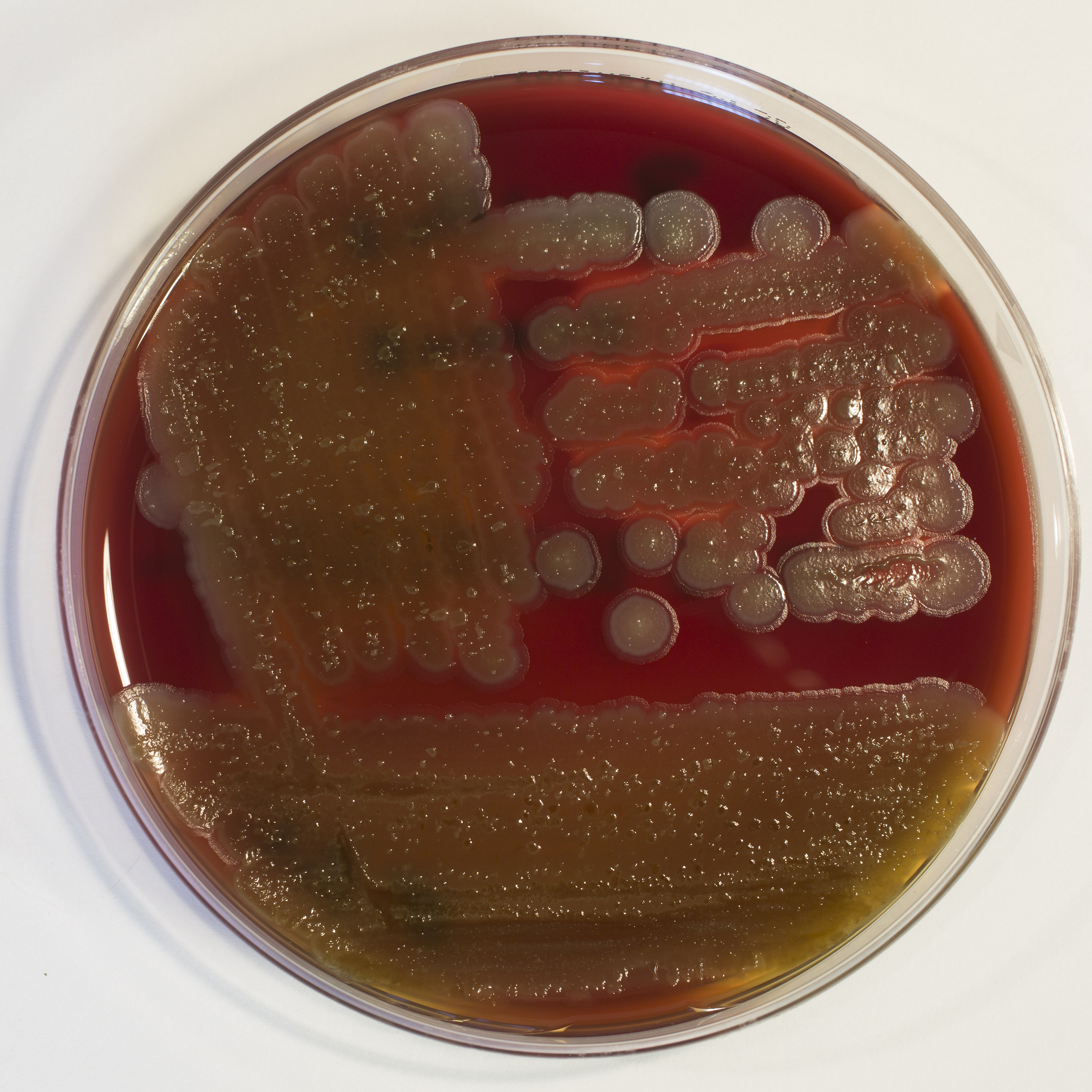
Bacillus cereus: "ground-glass" colonies displaying beta-hemolysis on blood agar

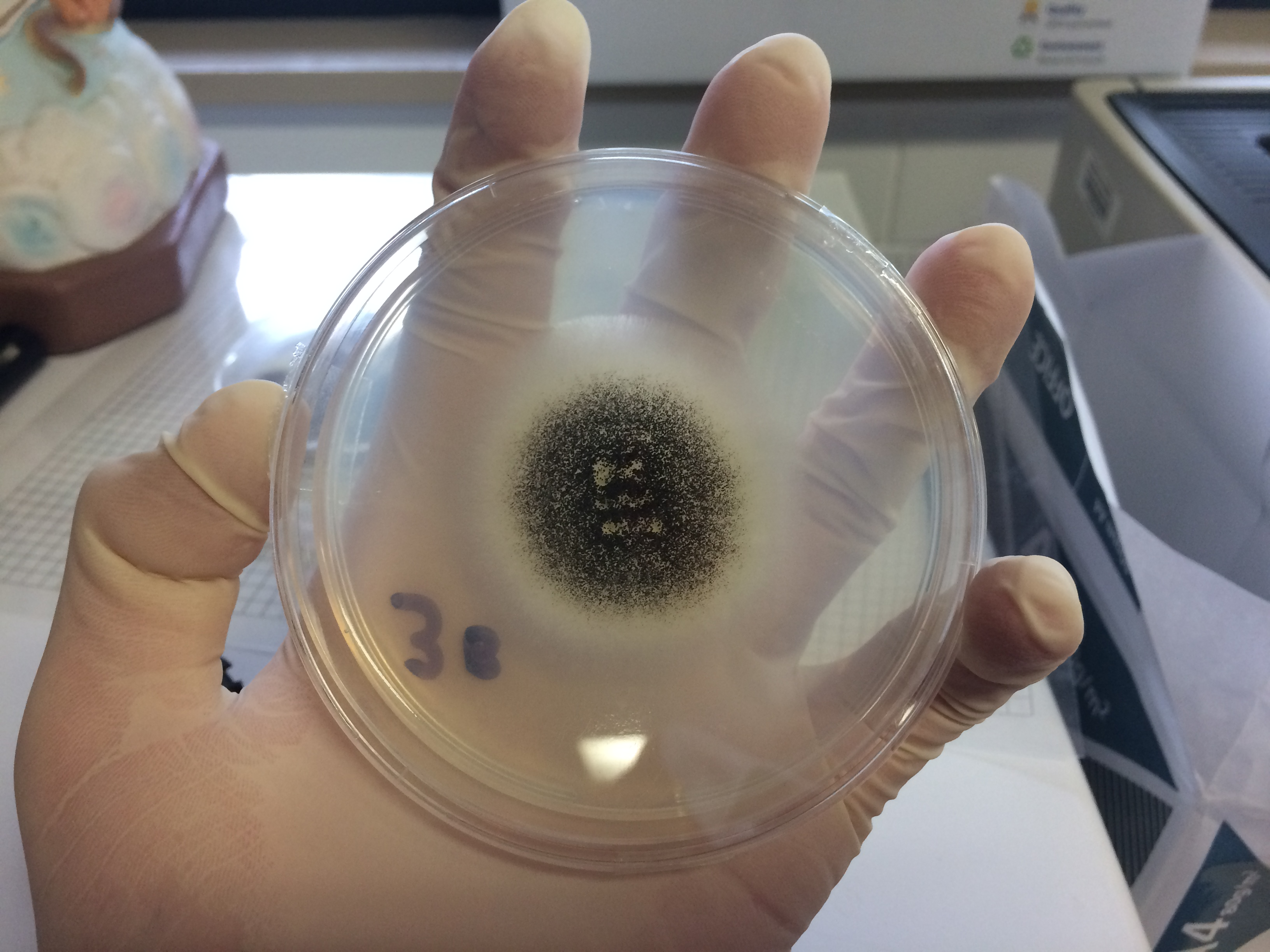
Aspergillus niger: granular colonies with a white edge and central black pigmentation

== Interpretation ==
Colonial morphology serves as the first step in the identification of microbial species from clinical samples. Based on the visual appearance of the colonies, microbiologists can narrow down the list of possible organisms, allowing them to select appropriate tests to provide a definitive diagnosis. For example, if a microbiologist observes colonies that resemble a Staphylococcus species, they may perform a catalase test to confirm that it belongs to the genus Staphylococcus, and a coagulase test to determine whether it is a coagulase-negative staphylococcus or a more pathogenic species, such as S. aureus.

Observation of hemolysis is useful in the presumptive identification of bacteria, especially streptococci, which are classified on the basis of their hemolytic reactions. For example, Streptococcus pyogenes, which causes strep throat and scarlet fever, displays beta-hemolysis, while Streptococcus pneumoniae, which can cause pneumonia and meningitis, displays alpha-hemolysis. The highly pathogenic S. aureus classically displays beta-hemolysis, while Staphylococcus epidermidis, part of the normal skin flora and an occasional opportunistic pathogen, does so weakly or not at all.

Although automated techniques like MALDI-TOF are increasingly used to identify microorganisms in clinical laboratories, colonial morphology remains useful to distinguish potential pathogens, which must be identified, from normal flora, for which definitive identification is unnecessary, and to confirm identification when automated techniques give inconclusive results.

== See also ==
- Bacterial cellular morphologies—the microscopic appearance of bacterial cells
