= Proteus OX19 =

Scientific classification
- Domain: Bacteria
- Kingdom: Pseudomonadati
- Phylum: Pseudomonadota
- Class: Gammaproteobacteria
- Order: Enterobacterales
- Family: Morganellaceae
- Genus: Proteus
- Species: P. vulgaris

Binomial name
- Proteus vulgaris Hauser, 1885

Species of bacterium

Proteus OX19 is a strain of the Proteus vulgaris bacterium.

== History ==
In 1915, Arthur Felix and Edward Weil discovered that Proteus OX19 reacted to the same human immune antibodies as typhus. Other Proteus strains were similarly used to create reagents for other rickettsiae diseases, thus resulting in the commercial Weil-Felix antibody-agglutination test.

=== Use in fake epidemic in Poland ===
Drs. Eugeniusz Lazowski and his medical-school friend Stanisław Matulewicz were practicing in the small town of Rozwadów in Poland during World War II. Dr. Matulewicz realized that since Proteus vulgaris strain OX19 was used to manufacture the then-common Weil-Felix antibody-agglutination test for typhus, inoculating villagers with dead Proteus would cause a false positive result without causing any disease. When the blood samples of the townspeople were sent to the German authorities for testing, authorities were convinced a typhus epidemic was raging in Rozwadów, and the area was avoided by the Germans, saving thousands of Poles.

== In fiction ==
The novel 1979 Night Trains, by Barbara Wood and Gareth Wootton, is a fictionalized account of the Proteus story, with details altered.
