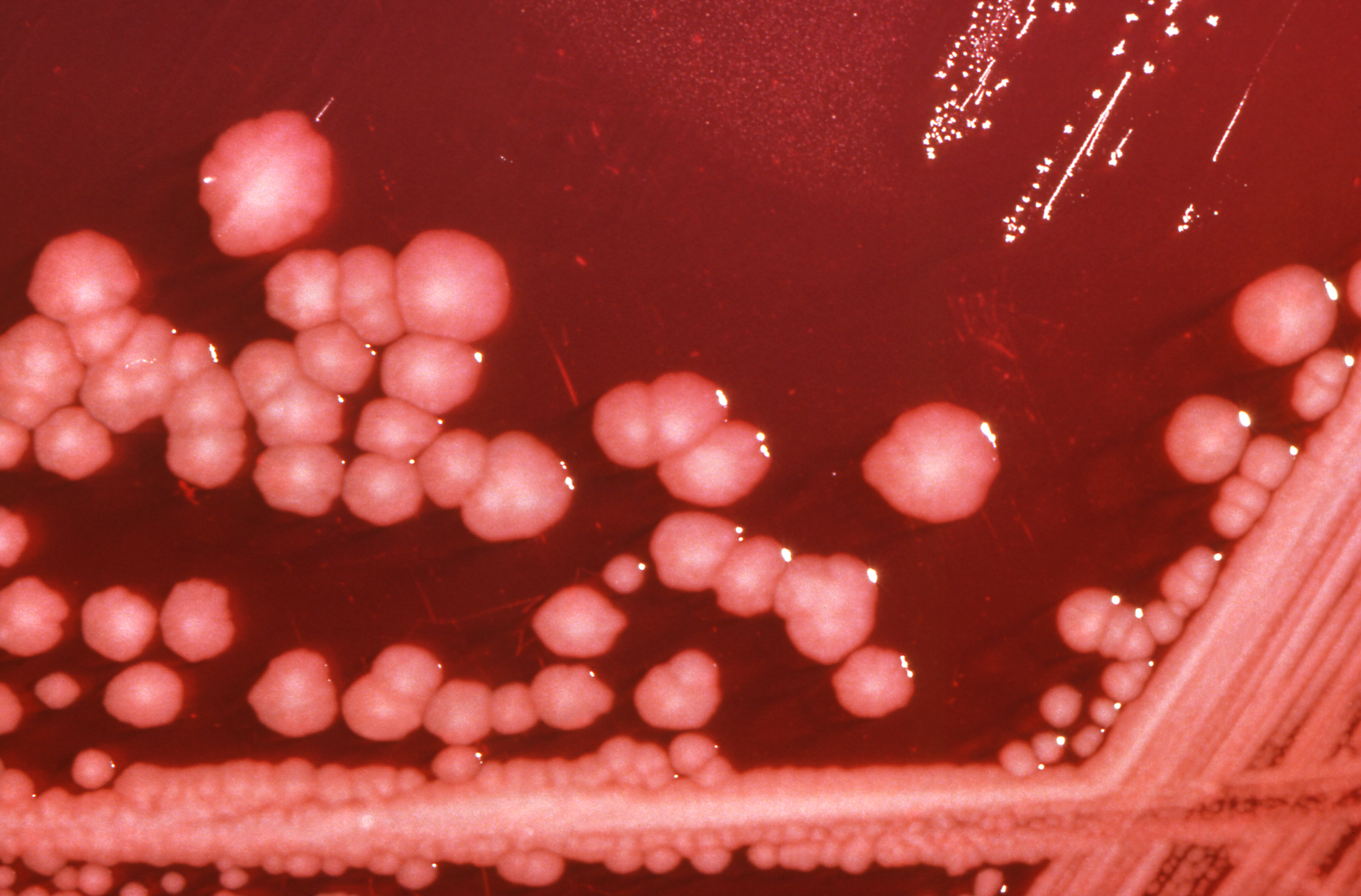
- P. mirabilis on an XLD agar plate.

Scientific classification
- Domain: Bacteria
- Kingdom: Pseudomonadati
- Phylum: Pseudomonadota
- Class: Gammaproteobacteria
- Order: Enterobacterales
- Family: Morganellaceae
- Genus: Proteus
- Species: P. mirabilis

Binomial name
- Proteus mirabilis Hauser, 1885

= Proteus mirabilis =

Species of bacterium

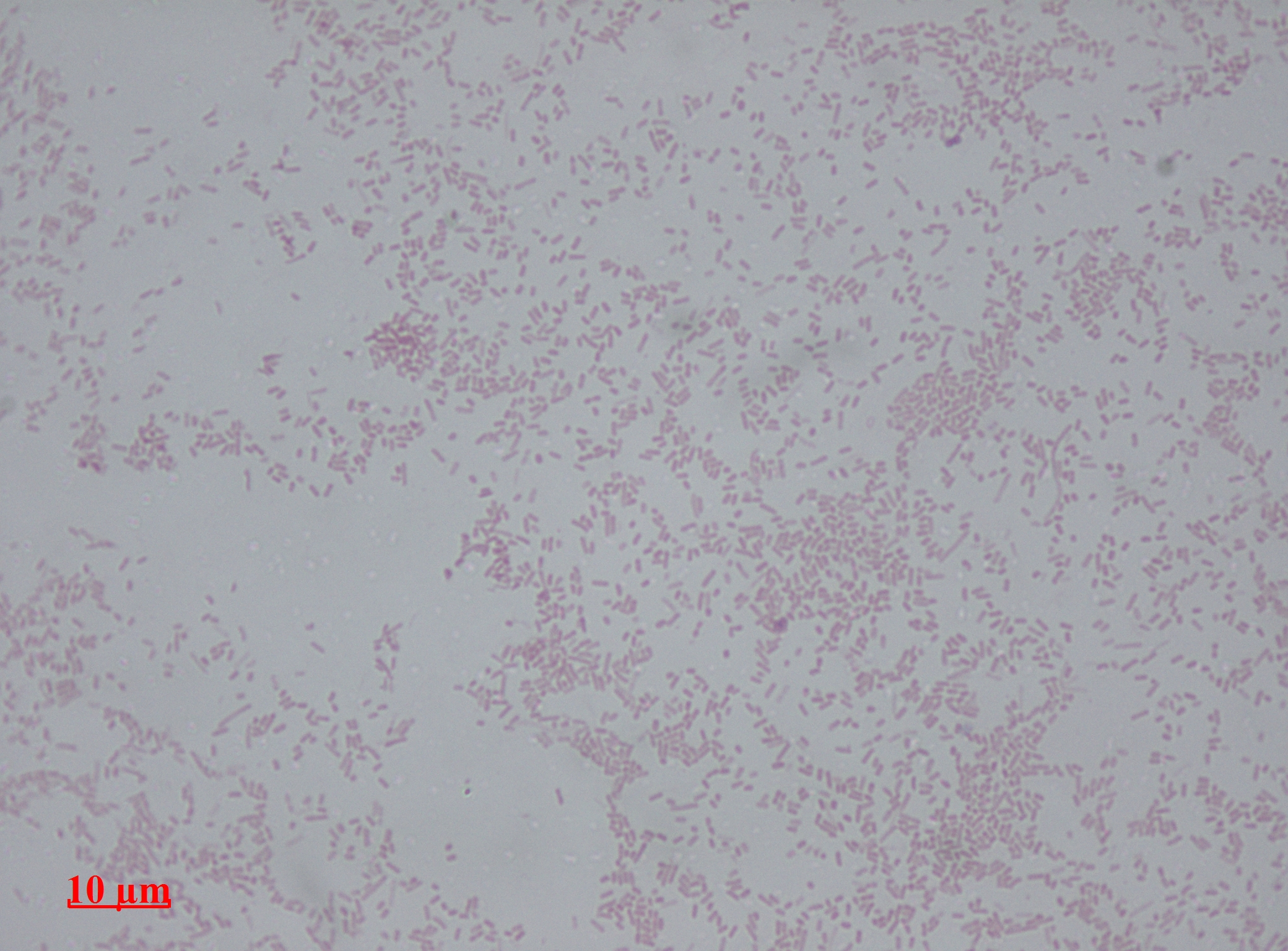
Proteus mirabilis appears as Gram-negative rods after Gram staining under bright-field microscopy with 1000 times magnification.

Proteus mirabilis is a Gram-negative, facultatively anaerobic, rod-shaped, nitrate-reducing, indole-negative bacterium. It shows swarming motility and urease activity. P. mirabilis causes 90% of all Proteus infections in humans. It is widely distributed in soil and water. Proteus mirabilis can migrate across the surface of solid media or devices using a type of cooperative group motility called swarming. Proteus mirabilis is most frequently associated with infections of the urinary tract, especially in complicated or catheter-associated urinary tract infections.

== Diagnosis ==
An alkaline urine sample is a possible sign of P. mirabilis. It can be diagnosed in the lab due to characteristic swarming motility, and inability to metabolize lactose (on a MacConkey agar plate, for example). Also P. mirabilis produces a very distinct fishy odor.

== Disease ==
This rod-shaped bacterium has the ability to produce high levels of urease, which hydrolyzes urea to ammonia (NH_{3}), so makes the urine more alkaline. Prolonged increased alkalinity can lead to the formation of crystals of struvite, calcium carbonate, and/or apatite, which can result in struvite kidney stones. Delayed or suboptimal treatment often allows these kidney stones to act as a nidus for P. mirabilis growth causing recurrent infections despite antibiotic treatment. If the stones grow large enough they can cause obstruction and kidney failure. Proteus species can also cause wound infections, sepsis, and pneumonia, mostly in hospitalized patients.

== Treatment ==
P. mirabilis is generally susceptible to most antibiotics apart from tetracycline and nitrofurantoin, but 10–20% of P. mirabilis strains are also resistant to first-generation cephalosporins and ampicillin.

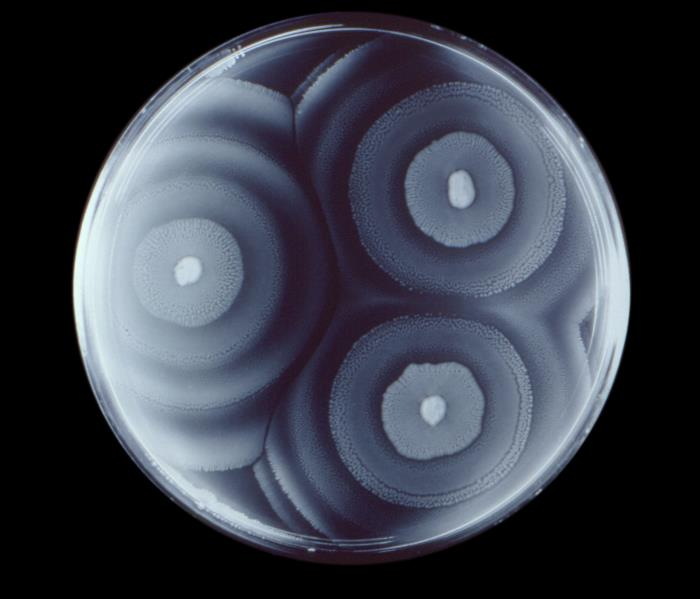
Proteus mirabilis in trypticase soy agar growth media

== Characteristics ==
P. mirabilis can use urea. It can produce hydrogen sulfide gas, and forms clear films on growth media. It is motile, possessing peritrichous flagella, and is known for its swarming ability. It is commonly found in the human digestive system. P. mirabilis is not pathogenic in guinea pigs or chickens. This species' ability to inhibit growth of unrelated strains had been a topic for scientific curiosity, which then resulted in the discovery of a macroscopically visible line of reduced bacterial growth where two swarming strains intersect. This line is named the Dienes line after its discoverer Louis Dienes.

The micro-organism tests:

- Indole-negative and nitrate reductase-positive (no gas bubbles produced)
- Methyl red-positive and Voges-Proskauer negative (Can be both MR- and V-P-positive)
- Catalase positive and cytochrome oxidase-negative
- Phenylalanine deaminase-positive
- Tryptophan test-negative
- Urea test-positive
- Casein test-negative
- Starch test-negative
- Hydrogen sulfide test-positive
- Citrate agar test-positive
- Ornithine decarboxylase-positive
- Lysine decarboxylase-positive
- No fermentation of arabinose, sorbitol and dulcitol

== Swarming motility ==
Swarming is a specialized form of motility that groups of multicellular, flagellated bacteria can undergo to expand their populations to new locations. The swarming capability of Proteus mirabilis is important because it is implicated in the pathogenesis of the bacteria and the swarming capability is associated with the bacteria's ability to express virulence factors Proteus mirabilis has a very characteristic bulls-eye appearance on an agar plate due to the regular periodic cycling between the vegetative and swarming state of the cells.

In liquid culture, Proteus mirabilis exists as a vegetative cell that is approximately 2 μm long and has four to ten peritrichous flagella. In the vegetative cell the flagella are used to propel the bacterium forward. Swarming cells are only formed when the bacteria are grown on solid surfaces so the ability to detect these solid surfaces is a required feature. It has been proposed that Proteus mirabilis senses a solid surface by the inhibition of its flagellum rotation, and it is this lack of freely rotating flagella that let the bacteria know it is on a solid surface. When Proteus mirabilis encounters a solid surface, and other necessary conditions have been met, the cell will undergo the differentiation process into a swarmer cell. This differentiation process includes the elongation of the cell 20 to 50 times longer than the vegetative cell, multinucleation, and more than a 50-fold greater surface density of flagella.

The swarming process continues as periodic cycles of cell differentiation, population migration, and consolidation as the bacteria undergo these changes in response to environmental stimulants. The repetition of this cycle is what gives Proteus mirabilis its distinctive bulls-eye pattern when growing on solid media. This pattern can be used to distinguish Proteus mirabilis from other species of swarming bacteria. Each ring is formed when the bacteria is in the consolidation stage and the bacteria is increasing in population.
