= Dienes phenomenon =

Observation in bacterial cultures

Dienes phenomenon, when two identical Proteus cultures are inoculated at different points on the same plate of non-inhibitory medium, the resulting swarming of growth coalesce without signs of demarcation. When, however, two different strains of Proteus are inoculated, the spreading films of growth fail to coalesce and remain separated by a narrow easily visible area. The observation of this appearance, the Dienes phenomenon has been used to determine the identity or non-identity of strains in epidemiological studies.
