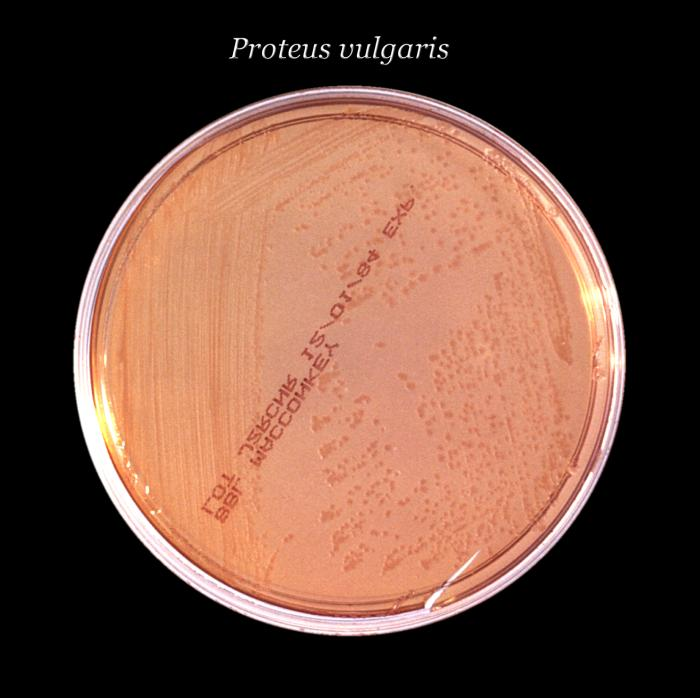
- 24-hour-old culture

Scientific classification
- Domain: Bacteria
- Kingdom: Pseudomonadati
- Phylum: Pseudomonadota
- Class: Gammaproteobacteria
- Order: Enterobacterales
- Family: Morganellaceae
- Genus: Proteus
- Species: P. vulgaris

Binomial name
- Proteus vulgaris Hauser, 1885

= Proteus vulgaris =

Species of bacterium

Proteus vulgaris is a rod-shaped, nitrate-reducing, indole-positive and catalase-positive, hydrogen sulfide-producing, Gram-negative bacterium that inhabits the intestinal tracts of humans and animals. It can be found in soil, water, and fecal matter. It is grouped with the Morganellaceae and is an opportunistic pathogen of humans. It is known to cause wound infections and other species of its genera are known to cause urinary tract infections.

P. vulgaris was one of the three species Hauser isolated from putrefied meat and identified (1885).

Over the past two decades, the genus Proteus, and in particular P. vulgaris, has undergone a number of major taxonomic revisions. In 1982, P. vulgaris was separated into three biogroups on the basis of indole production. Biogroup one was indole negative and represented a new species, P. penneri, while biogroups two and three remained together as P. vulgaris.

== Lab identification ==
According to laboratory fermentation tests, P. vulgaris ferments glucose and amygdalin, but does not ferment mannitol or lactose. P. vulgaris also tests positive for the methyl red (mixed acid fermentation) test and is also an extremely motile organism.

When P. vulgaris is tested using the API 20E identification system it produces positive results for sulfur reduction, urease production, tryptophan deaminase production, indole production, sometimes positive gelatinase activity, and saccharose fermentation, and negative results for the remainder of the tests on the testing strip.

It is referenced in the Analytical Profile Index using the nine-digit code: 047602157.

The optimal growing conditions of this organism is in a facultative anaerobic environment with an average temperature of about 40 °C.

The Becton/Dickinson BBL Enterotube II system for identification of members of the order Enterobacterales inoculated with P. vulgaris may yield the following results:

- Positive for glucose fermentation (with gas production)
- Negative for lysine and ornithine
- Positive for hydrogen sulfide production and indole production
- Negative for lactose, arabinose, adonitol, sorbitol and dulcitol
- Positive for the phenylalanine test and the Harnstoff urea test

P. vulgaris can test positive or negative for citrate. All combine for a Biocode ID of 31406, (Biocode ID 31402, 31404, 31407 all resulting in P. vulgaris with asymptomatic results) for use in the Interpretation Guide/Computer Coding and Identification System. P. vulgaris can also test urease negative in solid media (such as in Enterotube), but will be urease positive in liquid media. The CCIS code will still identify it with a negative urease test. When inoculated in a gelatin stab test, P. vulgaris is capable of hydrolysis of gelatin.

== Proteus infections ==
=== Cause and epidemiology ===
- Nosocomial infections
- P. mirabilis causes 90% of Proteus infections.
- A surveillance study conducted between 2000 and 2005 found that women (69%) are at a higher risk for developing P. vulgaris infections.
- P. vulgaris and P. penneri are easily isolated from individuals in long-term care facilities and hospitals and from patients with underlying diseases or compromised immune systems.
- Patients with recurrent infections, those with structural abnormalities of the urinary tract, those who have had urethral instrumentation, and those whose infections were acquired in the hospital have an increased frequency of infection caused by Proteus and other organisms (e.g., Klebsiella, Enterobacter, Pseudomonas, enterococci, and staphylococci).
- P. vulgaris is highly resistant to antibiotics because of the plasmids present in the bacterium, making infections extremely difficult to cure. This is because the plasmids have varied drug resistant markers on them.

=== Clinical expression ===
Enterobacterales (of which Proteus is a member) and Pseudomonas species are the micro-organisms most commonly responsible for Gram-negative bacteremia and sepsis.

The presence of the sepsis syndrome associated with a urinary tract infection (UTI) should raise the possibility of urinary tract obstruction. This is especially true of patients who reside in long-term care facilities, who have long-term indwelling urethral catheters, or who have a known history of urethral anatomic abnormalities.

UTI obstruction

Urease production leads to precipitation of organic and inorganic compounds, which leads to struvite stone formation. Struvite stones are composed of a combination of magnesium ammonium phosphate (struvite) and calcium carbonate-apatite. Struvite stone formation can be sustained only when ammonia production is increased and the urine pH is elevated to decrease the solubility of phosphate. Both of these requirements can occur only when urine is infected with a urease-producing organism such as Proteus. Urease metabolizes urea into ammonia and carbon dioxide: urea 2 NH_{3} + CO_{2}. The ammonia/ammonium buffer pair has a pK of 9.0, resulting in the combination of highly alkaline, ammonia-rich urine.

Symptoms attributable to struvite stones are uncommon. More often, women present with UTI, flank pain, or hematuria, and are found to have a persistently alkaline urine pH (>7.0).

== Treatments ==
Antibiotics to which P. vulgaris is known to be sensitive:

- Ciprofloxacin
- Ceftazidime
- Netilmicin
- Sulbactam or cefoperazone
- Meropenem
- Piperacillin/tazobactam
- Ampicillin/sulbactam

== See also ==
- Proteus OX19
- Swarming motility
