= Struvite =

Magnesium ammonium phosphate mineral

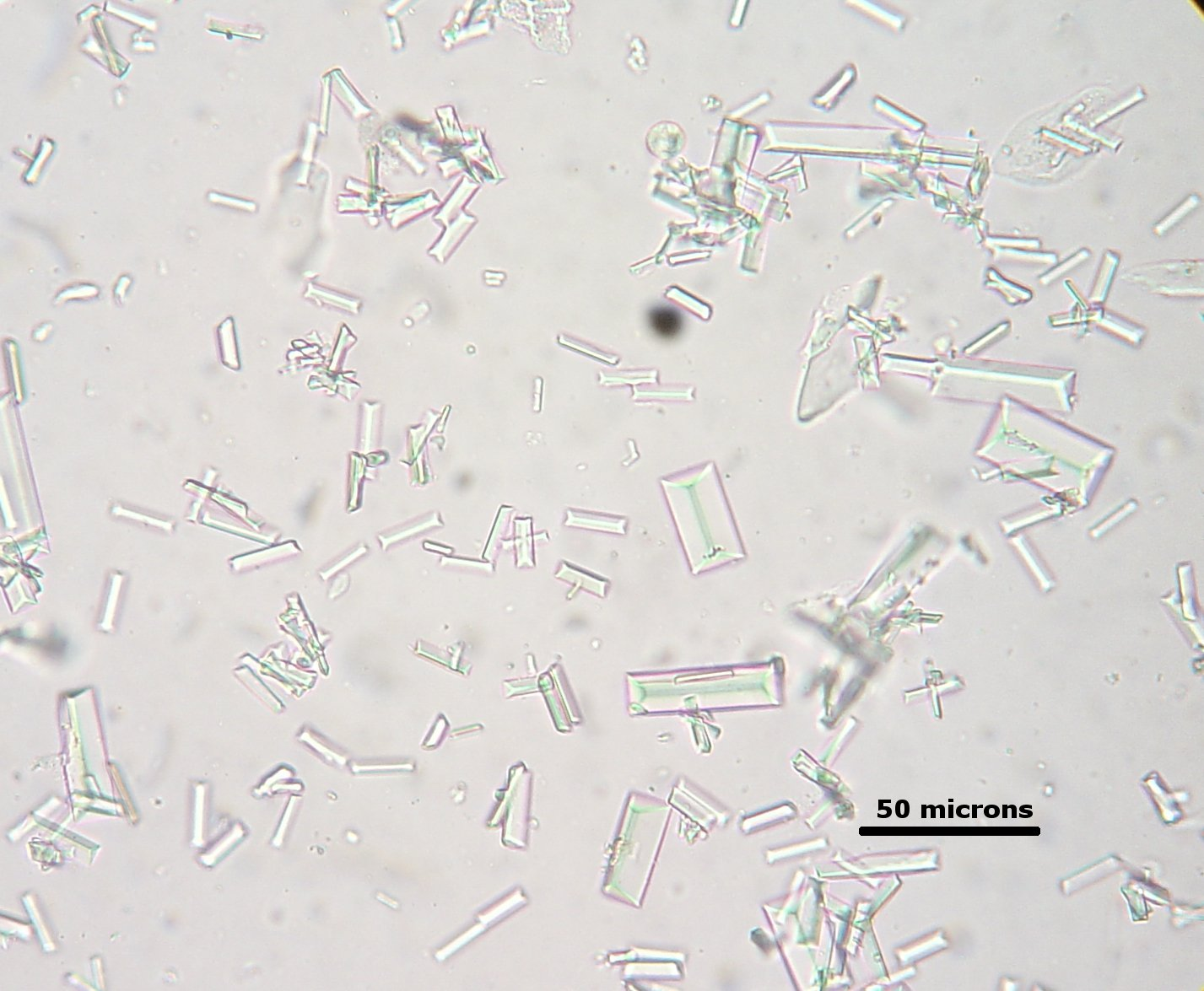
- Crystals of struvite from dog urine

General
- Category: Phosphate mineral
- Formula: NH_{4}MgPO_{4}·6H_{2}O
- IMA symbol: Suv
- Strunz classification: 8.CH.40
- Crystal system: Orthorhombic
- Crystal class: Pyramidal (mm2); H-M symbol: (mm2)
- Space group: Pmn2_{1}

Identification
- Color: Colorless, white (dehydrated), yellow or brownish, light gray
- Crystal habit: Euhedral to platy
- Twinning: On {001}
- Cleavage: {100} perfect
- Fracture: Uneven
- Mohs scale hardness: 1.5–2
- Luster: Vitreous to dull
- Streak: White
- Diaphaneity: Transparent to translucent
- Specific gravity: 1.7
- Optical properties: Biaxial (+) 2V Measured: 37°
- Refractive index: nα = 1.495 nβ = 1.496 nγ = 1.504
- Birefringence: δ = 0.009
- Solubility: Slightly soluble, dehydrates in dry, warm air
- Other characteristics: Pyroelectric and piezoelectric

Struvite (magnesium ammonium phosphate, sometimes abbreviated as MAP) is a phosphate mineral with formula: NH_{4}MgPO_{4}·6H_{2}O. Struvite crystallizes in the orthorhombic system as white to yellowish or brownish-white pyramidal crystals or in platy mica-like forms. It is a soft mineral with Mohs hardness of 1.5 to 2 and has a low specific gravity of 1.7. It is sparingly soluble in neutral and alkaline conditions, but readily soluble in acid.

Struvite urinary stones and crystals form readily in the urine of animals and humans that are infected with ammonia-producing organisms. They are potentiated by alkaline urine and high magnesium excretion (high magnesium/plant-based diets). They also are potentiated by a specific urinary protein in domestic cats.

== Name ==
Although struvite was briefly mentioned in Hooke's Micrographia, it was first described in detail in 1845 by the German chemist Georg Ludwig Ulex (1811–1883), who found crystals of struvite in what he surmised had once been a medieval midden in Hamburg, Germany; he named the new mineral after the geographer and geologist Heinrich Christian Gottfried von Struve (1772–1851) of Hamburg.

== Occurrence ==
Struvite readily forms in alkaline conditions where its constituent ions are present. In nature, it forms primarily in areas associated with organic matter decomposition, including guano deposits, basaltic caves, and marshlands. Struvite can cause problems in wastewater treatment plants when hardened mineral deposits build up inside pipes, pumps, and valves, restricting fluid flow and causing mechanical damage. Similar conditions are found when human bladders are infected by urease-producing bacteria.

Struvite is occasionally found in canned seafood, where its appearance is that of small glass slivers, objectionable to consumers for aesthetic reasons but of no health consequence. A simple test can differentiate struvite from glass.

=== Struvite kidney stones ===
Struvite kidney stones are also known as triple phosphate stones (calcium magnesium ammonium phosphate), owing to the presence of carbonate apatite that precipitates to accompany struvite at high pH. Struvite and carbonate apatite precipitate in alkaline urine, forming kidney stones. Struvite is the most common mineral found in urinary tract stones in dogs, and is found also in urinary tract stones of cats and humans. Struvite stones are potentiated by bacterial infection that hydrolyzes urea to ammonium and raises urine pH to neutral or alkaline values. Urea-splitting organisms include Proteus, Xanthomonas, Pseudomonas, Klebsiella, Staphylococcus, and Mycoplasma.

Even in the absence of infection, accumulation of struvite crystals in the urinary bladder is a problem frequently seen in housecats, with symptoms including difficulty urinating (which may be mistaken for constipation) or blood in the urine (hematuria). The protein cauxin, a protein excreted in large amounts in cat urine that acts to produce a feline pheromone, has recently been found to cause nucleation of struvite crystals in a model system containing the ions necessary to form struvite. This may explain some of the excess struvite production in domestic cats. In the past, surgery has been required to remove struvite uroliths in cats; today, special acidifying low magnesium diets may be used to dissolve sterile struvite stones.

Upper urinary tract stones that involve the renal pelvis and extend into at least two calyces are classified as staghorn calculi. Although all types of urinary stones can potentially form staghorn calculi, approximately 75% are composed of a struvite-carbonate-apatite matrix.

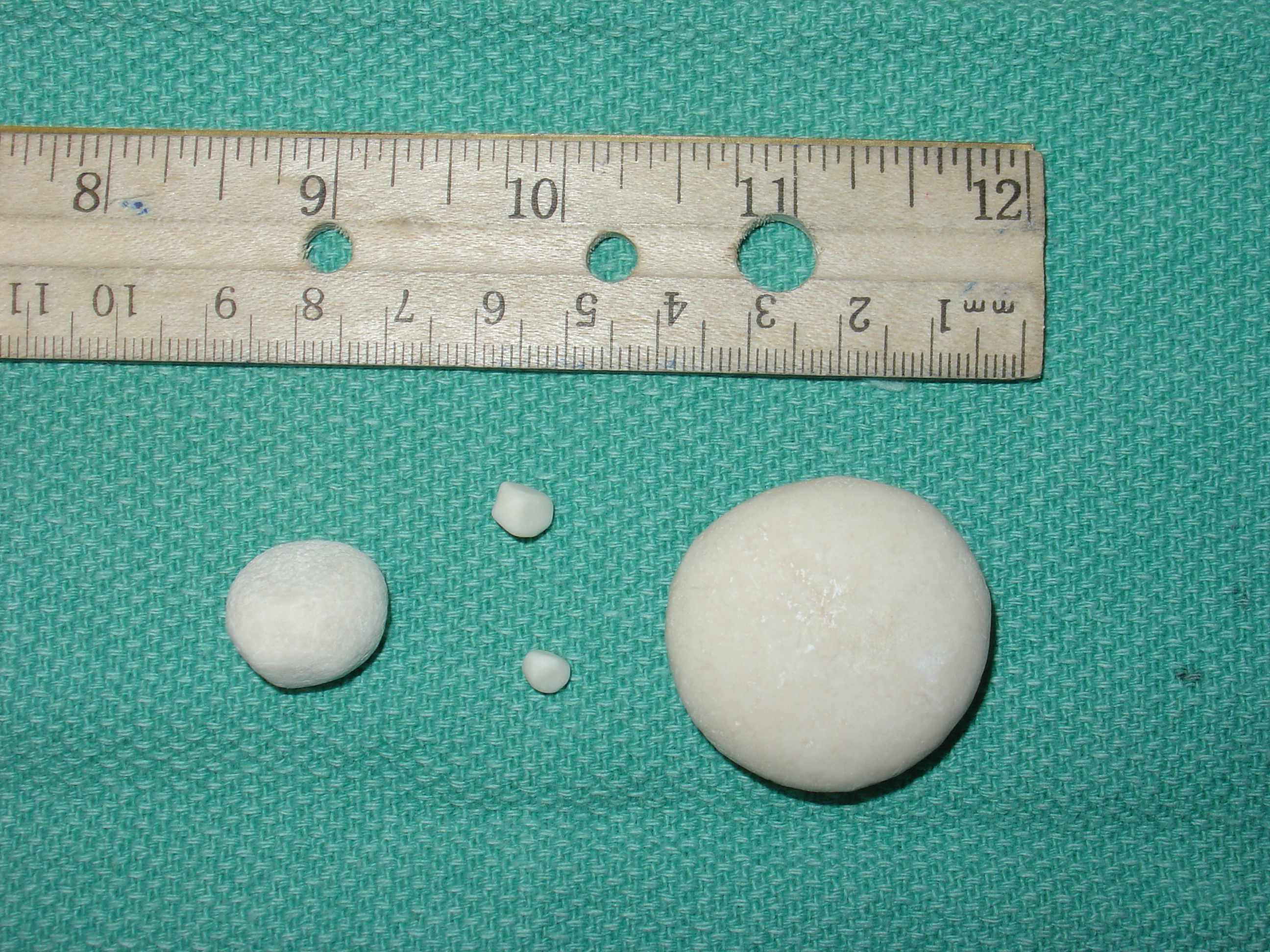
Dog struvite bladder stones

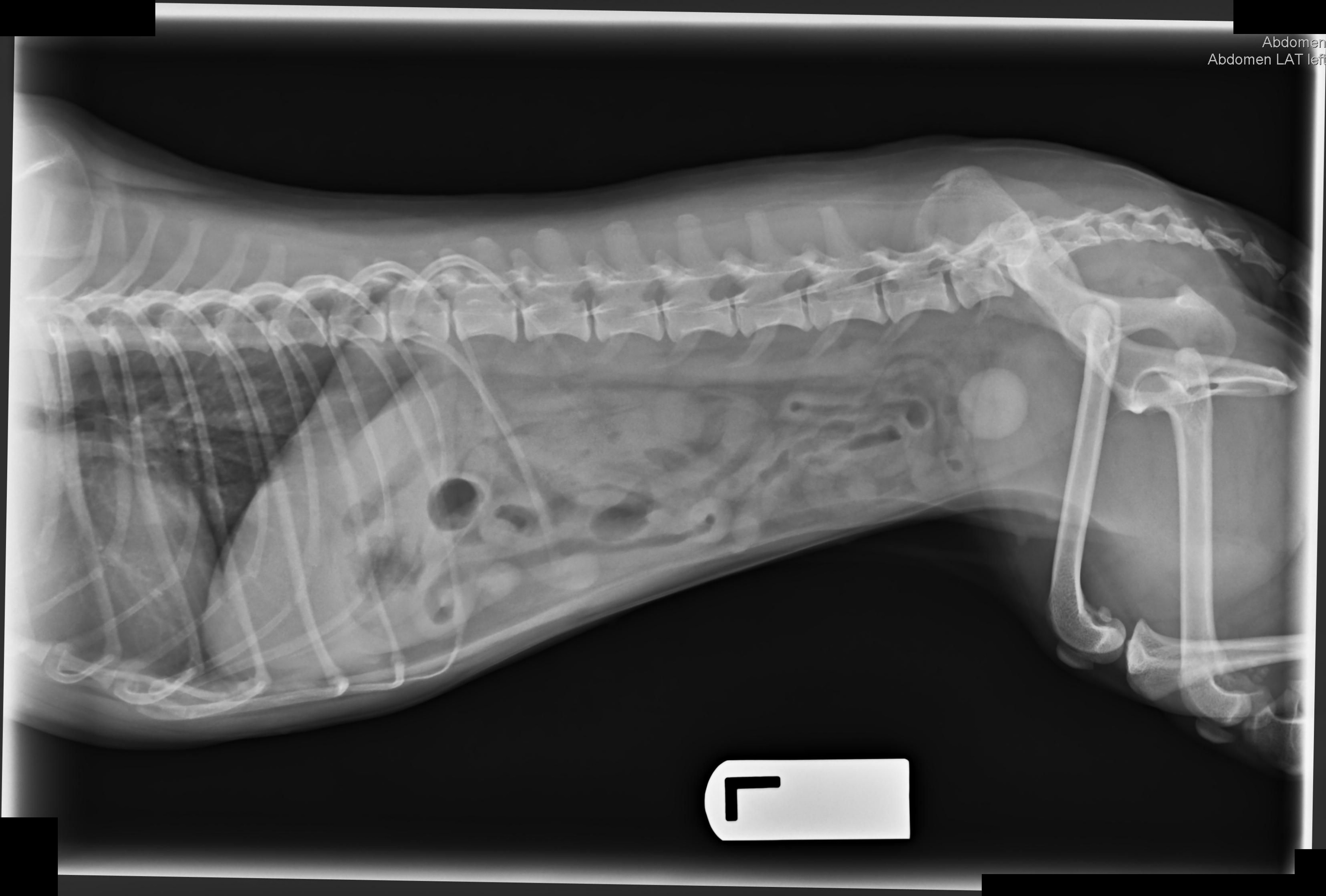
X-ray showing large struvite stone in bladder of small adult female dog (egg-shaped mass to left of femur)

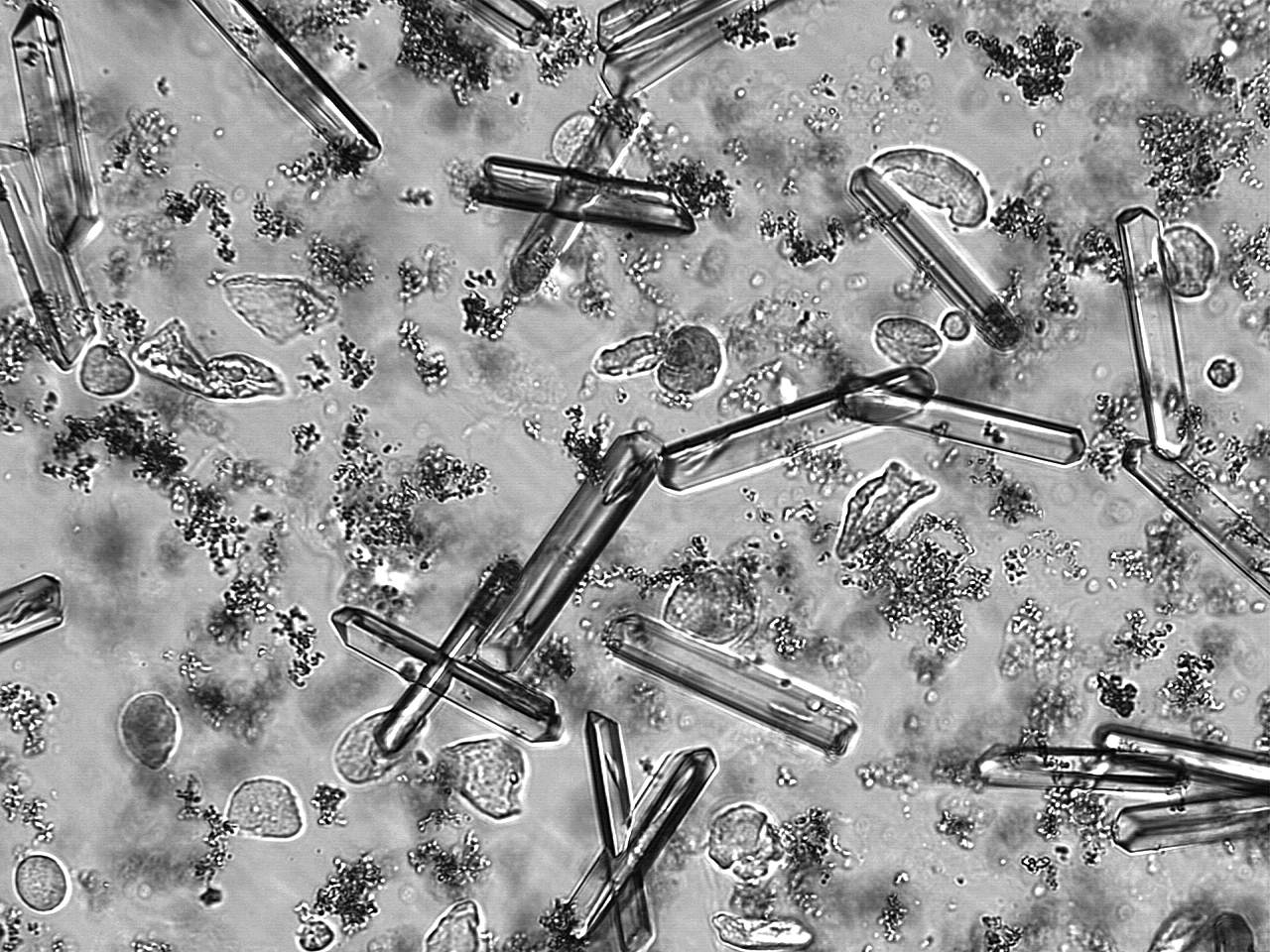
Struvite crystals in a human urine sample with a pH of 9. Abundant amorphous phosphate crystals, several squamous and non-squamous epithelial cells and a few leukocytes can also be observed.

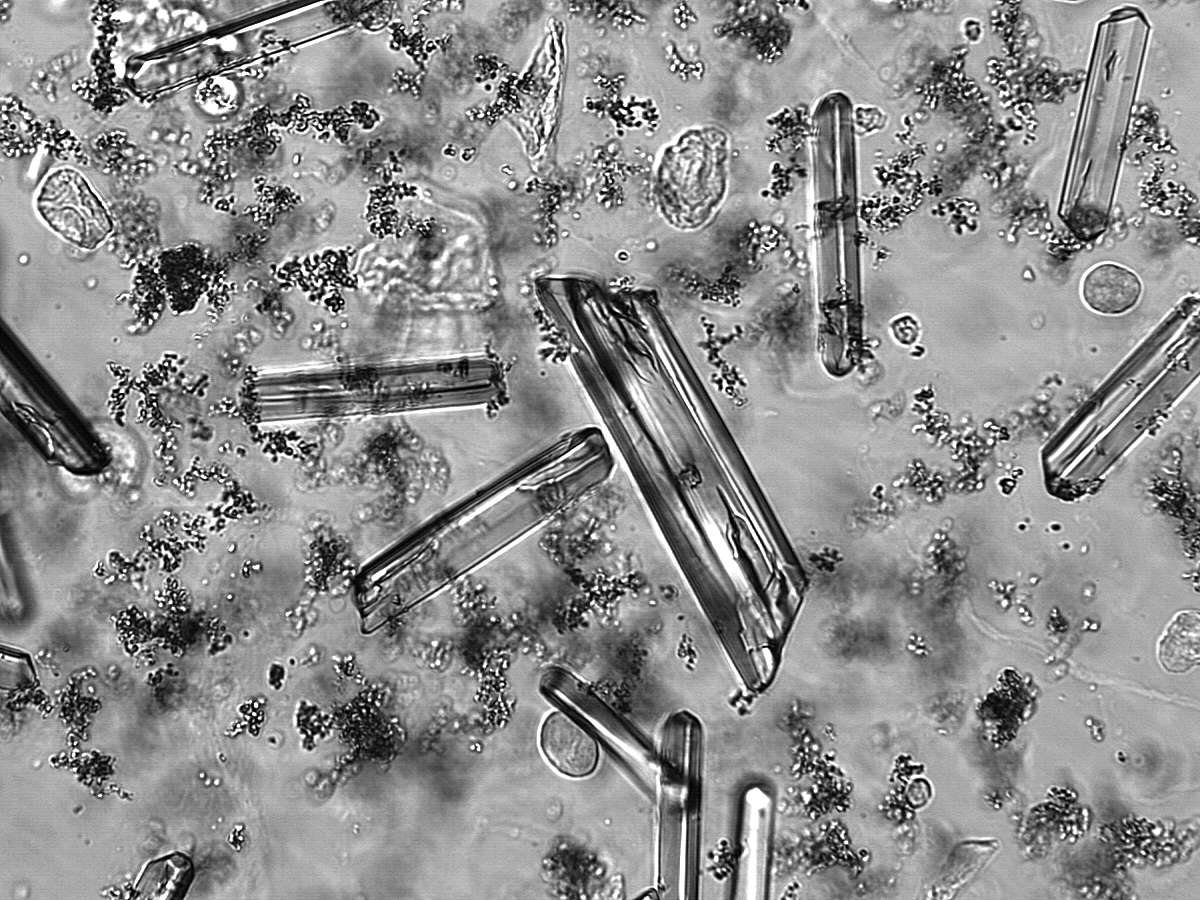
Another image from the same urine sample as with the image on the left.

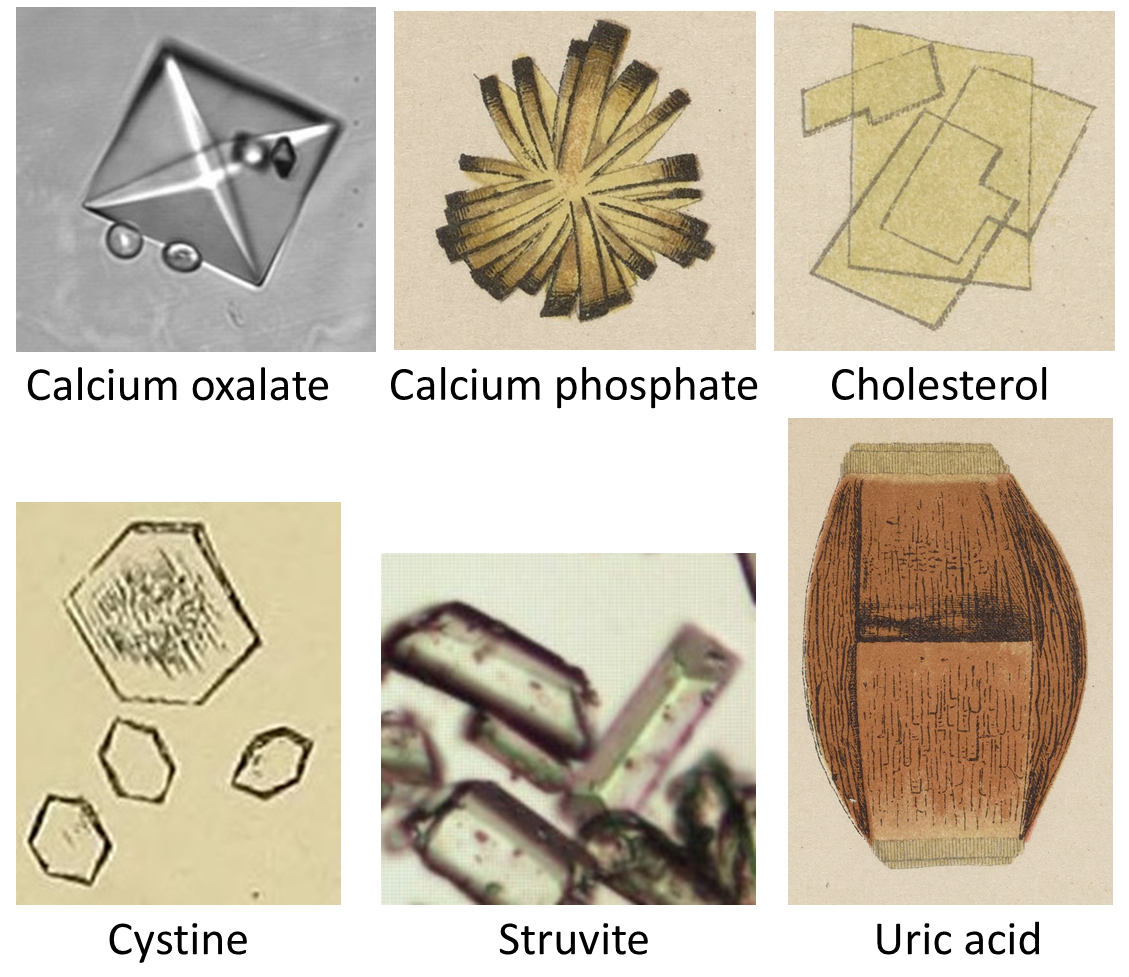
Comparison of different types of urinary crystals.

=== Struvite enteroliths ===
Struvite is a common mineral found in enteroliths (intestinal concretions) in horses.

=== Wastewater treatment ===
Struvite can be a problem in sewage and waste water treatment, particularly after anaerobic digesters release ammonium and phosphate from waste material. Struvite can form a scale on lines and belts, in centrifuges and pumps, clog system pipes and other equipment including the anaerobic digester itself. Struvite, also referred to as MAP, forms when there is a mole to mole to mole ratio (1:1:1) of magnesium, ammonia and phosphate in the wastewater. The magnesium can be found in soil, seawater, and drinking water. Ammonia is broken down from the urea in wastewater, and phosphate is found in food, soaps and detergents. These elements in place, struvite is more likely to form in a high pH environment, where there is higher conductivity, lower temperatures, and higher concentrations of magnesium, ammonia and phosphate. Recovery of phosphorus from wastestreams as struvite and recycling those nutrients into agriculture as fertilizer appears promising, particularly in agricultural manure and municipal waste water treatment plants.

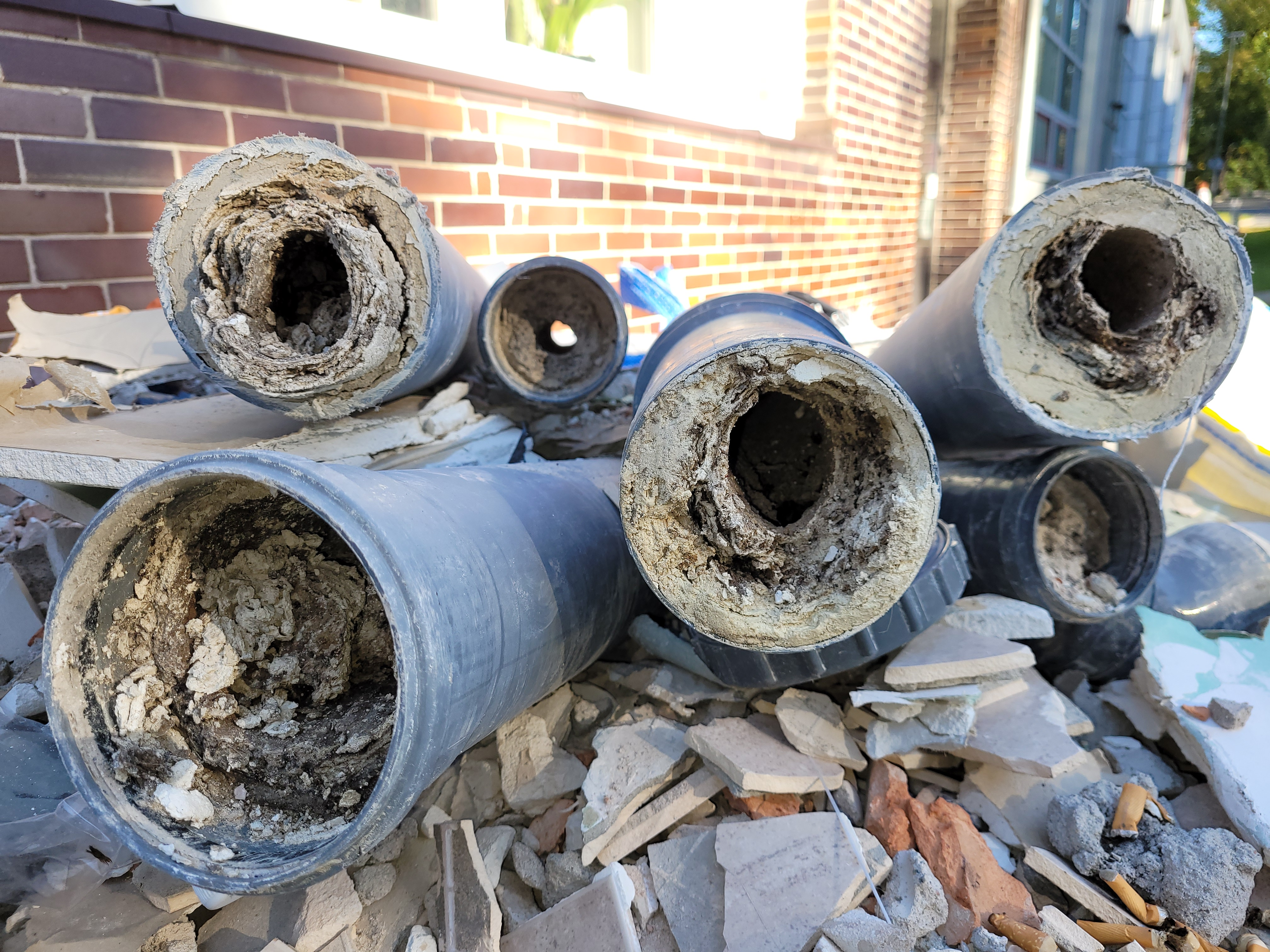
struvite-clogged sewer pipes

Having struvite scale in a wastewater treatment system can lead to great inefficiency within the plant or operation due to clogging of the pipes, pumps and equipment. There have been a few options to solve this issue, including replacing the pipes, or using a hydro-jetter or a mechanical grinder to clear them. But many lines can be underground and either of these options implies considerable downtime and labor.

Chemical cleaning is now predominately used to clear systems of struvite. Chemical cleaning products have been developed to remove and prevent struvite with minimal downtime.

Also, a chemical-free, electrical method of removing and preventing struvite has been developed and tested successfully at wastewater treatment plants in the US. An electronic sine wave is sent through the water in the pipe, and is effective on underground piping as well.

== Uses ==
=== Fertiliser ===
Use of struvite as an agricultural fertilizer was first described in 1857. It contains phosphorus and nitrogen, two of the three major plant macronutrients, with magnesium being a minor macronutrient as well. Struvite can be produced from urine by adjusting pH (often just by waiting for urease-producing bacteria to work) and adding magnesium. There is considerable interest in the utility of urine-derived struvite as a fertilizer in austere situations.

=== Fire retardant ===
Struvite is an active inorganic flame retardant. Zurich researchers have found that ureolytic protein bodies derived from watermelon seeds control struvite crystallization to produce large crystals. Construction panels of struvite-treated waste softwood sawdust homogeneously distributed in a hybrid composite are thereby given flame-retardant properties. The panels prove mechanically robust, lighter than equivalent cement-bonded particleboards, and with compressive strength. Efficient char-layer formation results in effective fire-shielding in internal walls.
