= Gustav Hauser =

German pathologist and bacteriologist

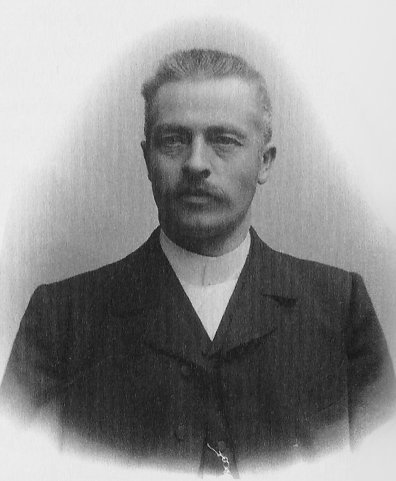
Gustav Hauser (1856-1935)

Gustav Hauser (13 July 1856 in Nördlingen – 30 June 1935 in Erlangen) was a German pathologist and bacteriologist.

He studied medicine at the Ludwig-Maximilians-Universität München and the University of Erlangen, where he worked as an assistant in the gynecological clinic under Paul Zweifel and at the pathological institute of Friedrich Albert von Zenker. In 1883, he obtained his habilitation for pathological anatomy and bacteriology, and in 1895 became a full professor and director of the institute of pathology at the University of Erlangen.

In 1885, Hauser was the first to isolate the bacillus Proteus vulgaris. He is also credited with developing a formalin for the preservation of bacterial cultures.

In Erlangen, the thoroughfare Gustav-Hauser-Straße is named in his honor.

== Published works ==
He was the author of works on numerous subjects in medicine. In the field of entomology, he was the author of Die Damaster-Coptolabrus-Gruppe der Gattung Carabus (The Damaster-Coptolabrus group and the genus Carabus). The following are a few of his publications in the field of medicine:

- Zur Histogenese des Cylinderepithelcarcinoms, 1883 - On histogenesis of cylindrical epithelial carcinoma.
- Das chronische Magengeschwür; sein Vernarbungsprocess und dessen Beziehungen zur Entwicklung des Magencarcinoms, 1883 - Chronic stomach ulcers, etc.
- Über Faulnissbacterien und deren Beziehungen zur Septicamie; ein Beitrag zur Morphologie der Spaltpilze, 1885 - Putrefication bacteria and their relationship to septicemia,
- Das Cylinderepithel-Carcinom des Magens und des Dickdarms, 1890 - Cylindrical carcinoma of the stomach and large intestine.
- Ueber die Protozoen als Krankheitserreger und ihre Bedeutung für die Entstehung der Geschwülste, 1895 - On protozoan pathogens and their connection to the formation of tumors.
