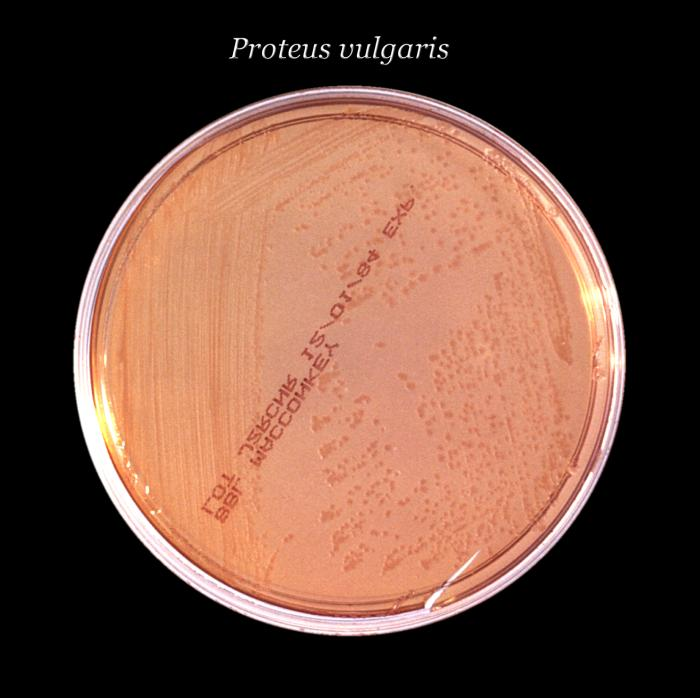
- Proteus vulgaris growth in MacConkey agar culture plate

Scientific classification
- Domain: Bacteria
- Kingdom: Pseudomonadati
- Phylum: Pseudomonadota
- Class: Gammaproteobacteria
- Order: Enterobacterales
- Family: Morganellaceae
- Genus: Proteus; Hauser, 1885

Species
- P. alimentorum; P. cibi; P. columbae; P. faecis; P. hauseri; P. mirabilis; P. myxofaciens; P. penneri; P. terrae; P. vulgaris

= Proteus (bacterium) =

Genus of bacteria

Proteus is a genus of Gram-negative bacteria. Proteus spp. are rod-shaped, facultatively anaerobic, and motile bacteria that exhibit swarming motility, allowing them to migrate across solid surfaces at temperatures 20 and 37 °C. Proteus spp. are widely distributed in nature as saprophytes, occurring in decomposing animal matter, sewage, manure-amended soil, and the mammalian gastrointestinal tract. They are opportunistic pathogens, commonly associated with urinary tract and septic infections, often of nosocomial origin .

The term Proteus signifies changeability of form, as personified in the Homeric poems in Proteus, "the old man of the sea", who tends the sealflocks of Poseidon and has the gift of endless transformation. The first use of the term “Proteus” in bacteriological nomenclature was made by Hauser (1885), who described under this term three types of organisms which he isolated from putrefied meat.

== Clinical significance ==
Three species—P. vulgaris, P. mirabilis, and P. penneri—are opportunistic human pathogens. Proteus includes pathogens responsible for many human urinary tract infections. P. mirabilis causes wound and urinary tract infections. Most strains of P. mirabilis are sensitive to ampicillin and cephalosporins. P. vulgaris is not sensitive to these antibiotics but ticarcillin. However, this organism is isolated less often in the laboratory and usually only targets immunosuppressed individuals. P. vulgaris occurs naturally in the intestines of humans and a wide variety of animals, and in manure, soil, and polluted waters. P. mirabilis, once attached to the urinary tract, infects the kidney more commonly than Escherichia coli. P. mirabilis is often found as a free-living organism in soil and water.

About 10–15% of kidney stones are struvite stones, caused by alkalinization of the urine by the action of the urease enzyme (which splits urea into ammonia and carbon dioxide) of Proteus (and other) bacterial species.

== Identification ==
Proteus species do not usually ferment lactose. Similar to other members of the Enterobacterales order, bacteria from the Proteus genus are glucose fermenting, oxidase-negative, catalase-positive, and nitrate-positive. Glucose fermentation in this species can be demonstrated through the triple sugar iron (TSI) test. Specific tests include positive urease (which is the fundamental test to differentiate Proteus from Salmonella) and phenylalanine deaminase tests.

At the species level, indole was historically considered a reliable biochemical marker, as it is positive for P. vulgaris and negative for P. mirabilis. However, further biochemical testing is now required to accurately speciate Proteus following the discovery of the indole-positive Proteus hauseri Most strains produce a powerful urease enzyme, which rapidly hydrolyzes urea to ammonia and carbon monoxide; exceptions are some Providencia strains. Species can be motile, and have characteristic "swarming" patterns. Underlying these behaviors are the somatic O and flagellar H antigens, so named based on Kauffman–White classification. This system is based on historic observations of Edmund Weil (1879–1922) and Arthur Felix (1887–1956) of a thin surface film produced by agar-grown flagellated Proteus strains, a film that resembled the mist produced by breath on a glass. Flagellated (swarming, motile) variants were therefore designated H forms (German Hauch, for film, literally breath or mist); nonflagellated (nonswarming, nonmotile) variants growing as isolated colonies and lacking the surface film were designated as O forms (German ohne Hauch, without film [i.e., without surface film of mist droplets]).

The cell wall O-antigen of certain strains of Proteus, such as OX-2, OX-19, OX-k, crossreact with several species of Rickettsia. These antigens can be used in laboratory to detect the presence of antibodies against certain Rickettsia species in patients' sera. This test is called Weil-Felix reaction after its originators.

== Food industry ==
Cheese makers have found Proteus bacterium's species Proteus vulgaris, growing on cheese rinds in purple color, making the cheese inedible. It is successful in implanting itself in a complex cheese ecosystem and substantially contributed to the organoleptic properties of cheese during ripening. It does not interact well with other bacteria in the same ecosystem.

== See also ==
- Dienes phenomenon
