= Swarming motility =

Swarm behaviour in bacteria

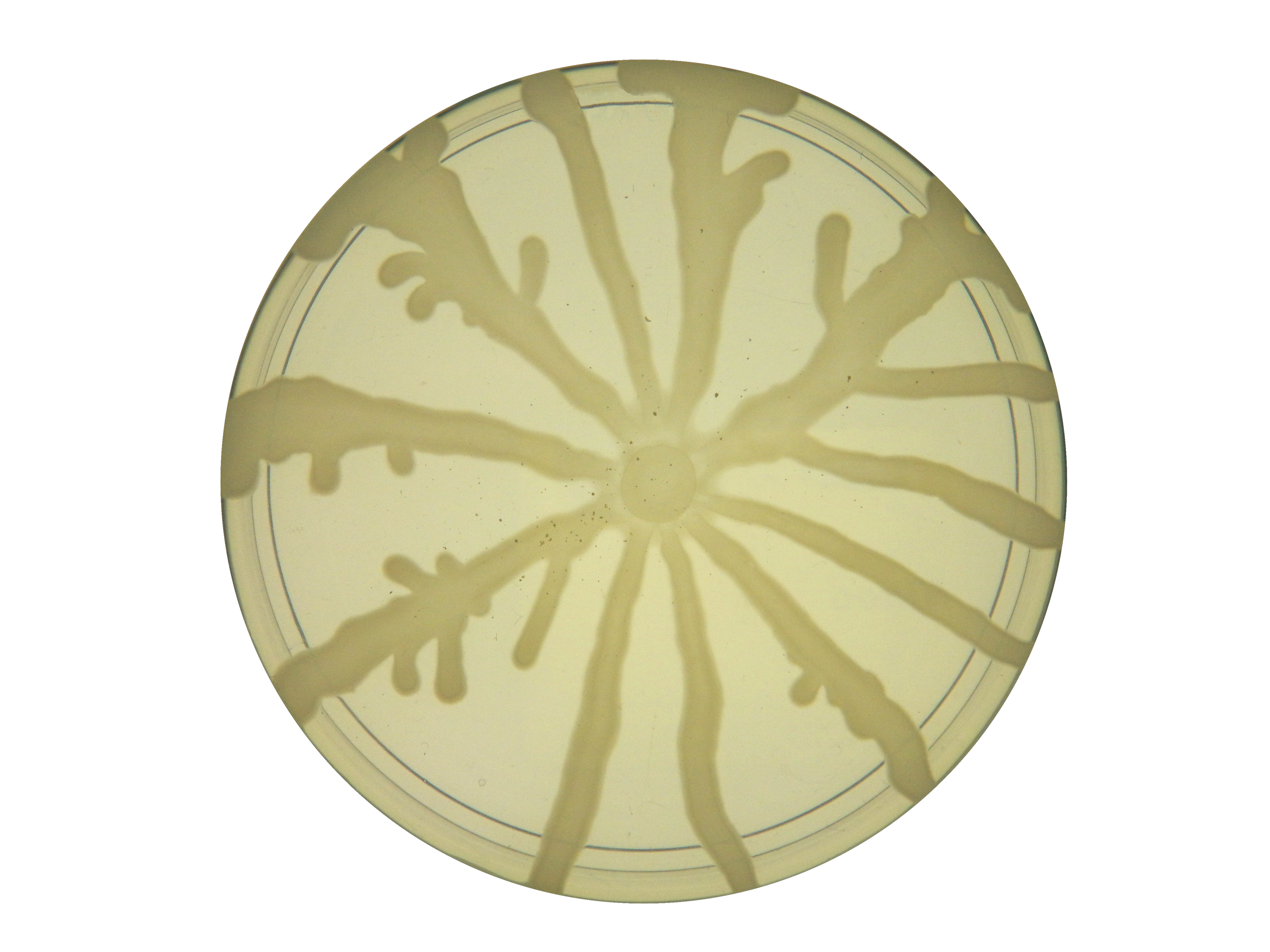
Pseudomonas aeruginosa exhibiting swarming motility

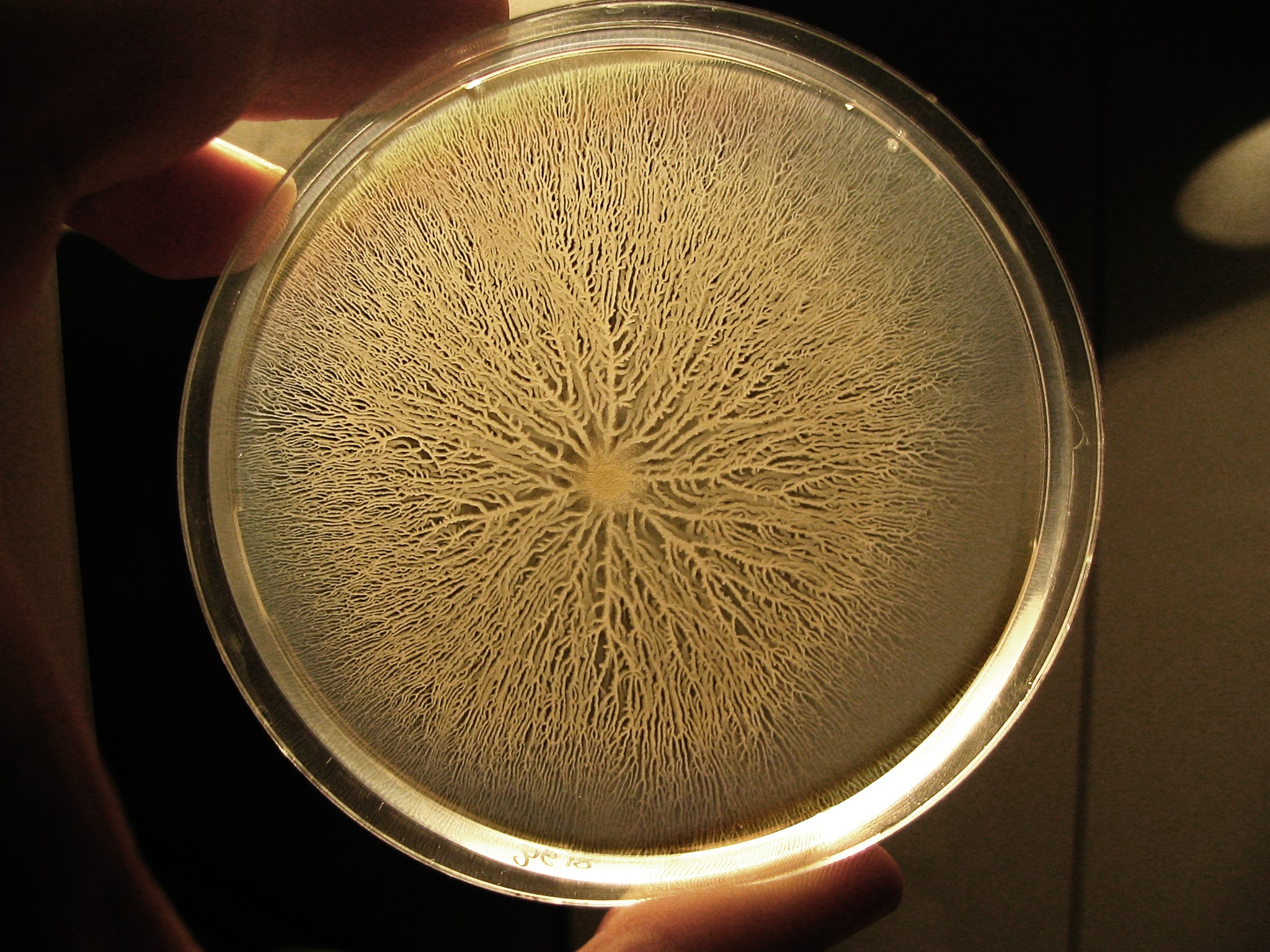
Bacteria of the species Bacillus subtilis were inoculated at the center of a dish with gelose containing nutrients. The bacteria start mass-migrating outwards about twelve hours after inoculation, forming dendrites which reach the border of the dish (diameter 90mm) within a few hours. Two days after inoculation the number of bacteria has increased so much that they diffuse light significantly and appear white. This picture was taken against a lightsource to make the dendrites (white branched structures) clearly stand out.

Swarming motility is a rapid (2–10 μm/s) and coordinated translocation of a bacterial population across solid or semi-solid surfaces, and is an example of bacterial multicellularity and swarm behaviour. Swarming motility was first reported by Jorgen Henrichsen and has been mostly studied in genus Serratia, Salmonella, Aeromonas, Bacillus, Yersinia, Pseudomonas, Proteus, Vibrio and Escherichia.

This multicellular behavior has been mostly observed in controlled laboratory conditions and relies on two critical elements: 1) the nutrient composition and 2) viscosity of culture medium (i.e. % agar). One particular feature of this type of motility is the formation of dendritic fractal-like patterns formed by migrating swarms moving away from an initial location. Although the majority of species can produce tendrils when swarming, some species like Proteus mirabilis do form concentric circles motif instead of dendritic patterns.

== Biosurfactant, quorum sensing and swarming ==
In some species, swarming motility requires the self-production of biosurfactant to occur. Biosurfactant synthesis is usually under the control of an intercellular communication system called quorum sensing. Biosurfactant molecules are thought to act by lowering surface tension, thus permitting bacteria to move across a surface.

== Cellular differentiation ==
Swarming bacteria undergo morphological differentiation that distinguish them from their planktonic state. Cells localized at migration front are typically hyperelongated, hyperflagellated and grouped in multicellular raft structures.

== Ecological significance ==
The fundamental role of swarming motility remains unknown. However, it has been observed that active swarming bacteria of Salmonella Typhimurium show an elevated resistance to certain antibiotics compared to undifferentiated cells.

== See also ==
- Bacterial motility
